= Independent International Scientific Panel on AI =

UN panel on artificial intelligence

The Independent International Scientific Panel on Artificial Intelligence is a multilateral scientific body established within the United Nations system to produce independent, evidence-based assessments of the development, opportunities, risks, and impacts of artificial intelligence (AI).

Formally established by United Nations General Assembly resolution A/RES/79/325 on 26 August 2025, the Panel is described as the first global scientific body dedicated entirely to artificial intelligence. Its mandate is rooted in the Global Digital Compact, adopted as part of the Pact for the Future in September 2024, which committed Member States to establish such a mechanism within the United Nations system.

The Panel's 40 members were appointed by the General Assembly on 12 February 2026 and elected Yoshua Bengio and Maria Ressa as Co-Chairs at the inaugural meeting on 3 March 2026.

The Panel is not a regulatory or enforcement body; it does not set binding rules, approve AI systems, or impose standards on governments or companies. Writing in Forbes, Ron Schmelzer compared its intended function to that of the Intergovernmental Panel on Climate Change (IPCC): a body designed to synthesise available scientific knowledge and place it at the service of global policy deliberation. A similar comparison was made in Nature.

== Background ==
The Panel emerged from a multi-year process of international deliberation on artificial intelligence governance within the United Nations system. In 2023, the United Nations Secretary-General convened the High-level Advisory Body on Artificial Intelligence, a temporary expert group tasked with examining options for international cooperation on AI. In August 2024, the Advisory Body published its final report, Governing AI for Humanity, which recommended the creation of a standing independent scientific panel and a universal dialogue on AI governance as complementary multilateral mechanisms.

In September 2024, Heads of State and Government adopted the Pact for the Future at the Summit of the Future in New York, including as Annex I the Global Digital Compact—the first universal intergovernmental agreement on digital cooperation. Paragraph 56(a) of the Compact committed Member States to establish a multidisciplinary Independent International Scientific Panel on AI within the United Nations, as well as a Global Dialogue on AI Governance. Following adoption of the Compact, the President of the General Assembly appointed co-facilitators to lead an intergovernmental negotiation on the Panel's terms of reference. The General Assembly adopted resolution A/RES/79/325 by consensus on 26 August 2025, formally establishing the Panel and the Global Dialogue.

== Establishment ==
An open call for nominations was published on 25 September 2025 and closed on 31 October 2025, attracting over 2,600 applications from more than 140 countries. Applications were reviewed by a selection committee drawing on the International Telecommunication Union (ITU), the United Nations Office for Digital and Emerging Technologies (ODET), and UNESCO. Following a merit-based process, the Secretary-General submitted a recommended list of 40 candidates to the General Assembly.

The General Assembly voted to appoint the 40 members on 12 February 2026, with 117 Member States voting in favour. The United States voted against, joined by Paraguay; Ukraine abstained.

The Panel held its inaugural meeting on 3 March 2026 at United Nations Headquarters in New York. Addressing the meeting, Secretary-General António Guterres called on the Panel to help decision-makers "build effective guardrails, unlock innovation for the common good, and strengthen international cooperation."

== Mandate and scope ==
The Panel's mandate is set out in resolution A/RES/79/325 and operates exclusively in the non-military domain. It is directed to produce evidence-based scientific assessments synthesising and analysing existing research on the opportunities, risks, and impacts of AI, and to issue one annual policy-relevant but non-prescriptive summary report, with thematic briefs as it deems necessary. The Panel is also required to present its annual report at each session of the Global Dialogue on AI Governance, and to provide updates to the General Assembly up to twice a year through an interactive dialogue with its Co-Chairs.

The Panel's outputs are designed to inform rather than direct the decisions of governments and other stakeholders. Topics within scope include the development of safe, secure, and trustworthy AI systems; the social, economic, ethical, cultural, linguistic, and technical implications of AI; transparency, accountability, and human oversight; the protection of human rights; open-source software, open data, and open AI models; and AI capacity gaps, particularly in developing countries.

== Composition ==
The Panel comprises 40 members serving in their individual expert capacity for a three-year term, and not as representatives of any government, institution, or interest group. Selection criteria include outstanding expertise in AI and related fields, an interdisciplinary perspective, and geographical and gender balance, with particular attention to representation of varying levels of technological development and inclusion of experts from developing countries. No more than two members may share the same nationality or institutional affiliation, and no current employees of the United Nations system are eligible.

The 40 members include 19 women and 21 men, drawn from all five United Nations regional groups: African States, Asia-Pacific States, Eastern European States, Latin American and Caribbean States, and Western European and Other States. Their backgrounds span core technical AI research, applied AI and infrastructure, and AI policy, ethics, and societal impact, with members drawn from academia, the private sector, civil society, government, and the technical community. All members are required to disclose financial, professional, or personal interests that could give rise to a conflict of interest, both at the time of nomination and on an ongoing basis.

At the inaugural meeting on 3 March 2026, the members elected two Co-Chairs. Yoshua Bengio of Canada, a professor at the Université de Montréal and co-president of LawZero, is a co-recipient of the 2018 Turing Award and is widely recognised as a pioneer of deep learning. Maria Ressa of the Philippines, co-founder and chief executive of Rappler and recipient of the 2021 Nobel Peace Prize, was elected as the co-chair representing the developing world. The resolution requires Co-Chairs to be elected from among Panel members, with one drawn from a developed country and one from a developing country, taking into account geographical and gender balance.

=== Members ===
The following 40 individuals were appointed by the General Assembly on 12 February 2026.

Name	Region	Background
Yoshua Bengio (co-chair)	Western European and Other States	AI research (deep learning)
Maria Ressa (co-chair)	Asia-Pacific States	AI policy, media and society
Bernhard Schölkopf	Western European and Other States	AI research (machine learning)
Adji Bousso Dieng	African States	AI research
Vukosi Marivate	African States	AI research and applications
Sonia Livingstone	Western European and Other States	AI policy and society
Carlos A. Coello Coello	Latin American and Caribbean States	AI research
Martha Palmer	Western European and Other States	AI research (natural language processing)
Vipin Kumar	Western European and Other States	AI research (data mining)
Qinghua Lu	Asia-Pacific States	AI policy and ethics
Johanna Pirker	Western European and Other States	Applied AI and AI research
Joyce Nakatumba-Nabende	African States	AI research and applications
Mark Coeckelbergh	Western European and Other States	AI ethics and philosophy
Teresa Ludermir	Latin American and Caribbean States	AI research
Tégawendé Bissyandé	African States	Applied AI and infrastructure
Awa Bousso Drame	African States	AI research
Loreto Bravo	Latin American and Caribbean States	AI policy and society
Haitao Song	Asia-Pacific States	AI research
Jian Wang	Asia-Pacific States	AI research and infrastructure
Mennatallah El-Assady	African States	AI research (visual analytics)
Girmaw Abebe Tadesse	African States	Applied AI
Anna Korhonen	Western European and Other States	AI research (natural language processing)
Joelle Barral	Western European and Other States	AI research
Maximilian Nickel	Western European and Other States	AI research
Balaraman Ravindran	Asia-Pacific States	AI research (reinforcement learning)
Hoda Heidari	Western European and Other States	AI ethics and fairness
Lior Rokach	Western European and Other States	AI research
Silvio Savarese	Western European and Other States	AI research (computer vision)
Yutaka Matsuo	Asia-Pacific States	AI research (deep learning)
Aleksandra Korolova	Western European and Other States	AI privacy and fairness
Rita Orji	African States	Applied AI and human-computer interaction
Bilal Mateen	Western European and Other States	AI in health
Piotr Sankowski _{[pl]}	Eastern European States	AI research (algorithms)
Juho Kim	Asia-Pacific States	AI and human-computer interaction
Andrei Neznamov	Eastern European States	AI policy and law
Alvitta Ottley	Western European and Other States	AI and data visualisation
Leslie Teo	Asia-Pacific States	Applied AI
Román Orús	Western European and Other States	AI research (quantum computing)
Melahat Bilge Demirkoz	Western European and Other States	AI and physics
Tuka Al-Hanai	Western European and Other States	AI research

== See also ==
- Global Digital Compact
- Pact for the Future
- Intergovernmental Panel on Climate Change
