= Seriki =

- Gender: Male
- Language: Yoruba

Origin
- Language: Nigeria
- Derivation: Sarkin
- Meaning: Lieutenant

listen

Seriki is both a Yoruba given name and a surname. It means "lieutenant" (probably derived from "Sarkin", the Hausa word for king). Notable people with the name include:

== Given name ==
- Seriki Williams Abass (died 1919), Nigerian slave merchant
- Seriki Audu (1991–2014), Nigerian footballer

== Surname ==
- Abdulfatai Yahaya Seriki (born 1975), Nigerian politician
- Ademola Rasaq Seriki (1959–2022), Nigerian politician
- Femi Seriki (born 2003), English footballer
- Florence Seriki (1963–2017), Nigerian entrepreneur
- Chamillionaire (Hakeem Seriki, born 1979), American rapper
- Meriga Salou Seriki (born 1953), Beninese boxer
