= Volker Türk =

Austrian lawyer and UN official (born 1965)

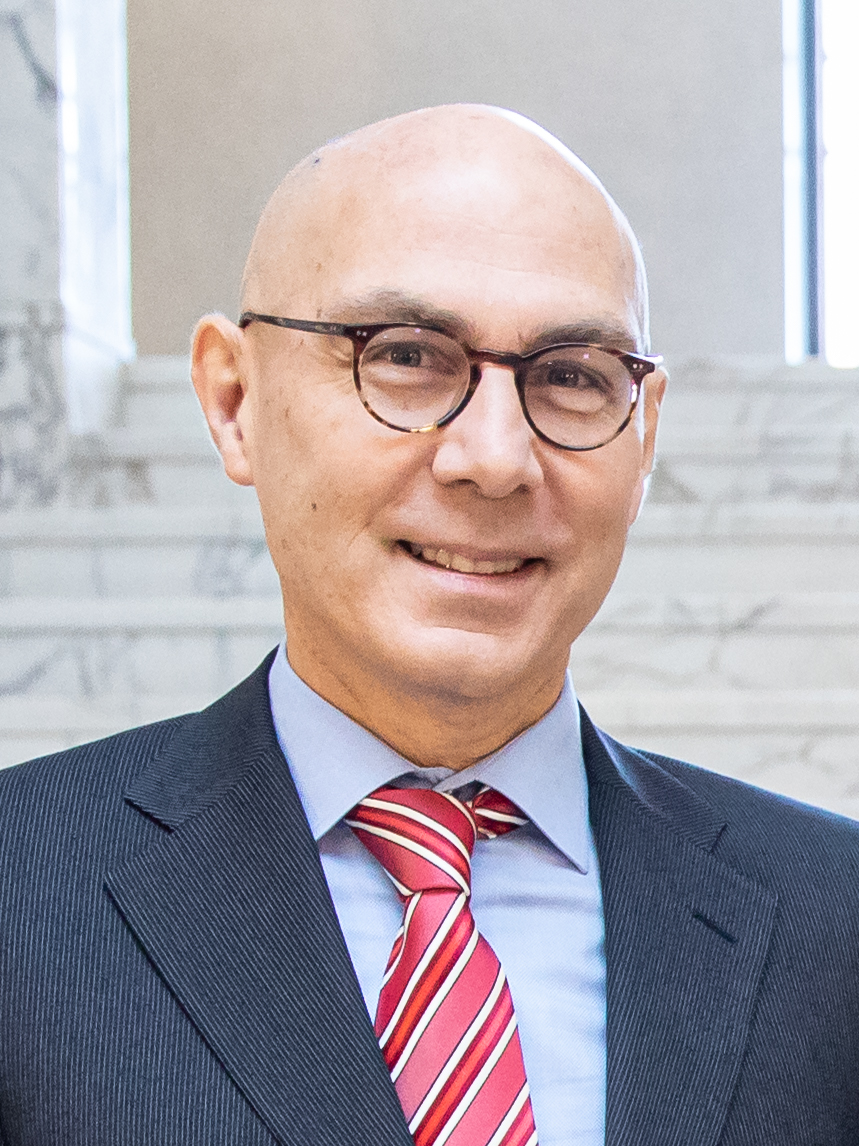
- Türk in 2022

United Nations High Commissioner for Human Rights
- Incumbent
- Assumed office 17 October 2022
- Secretary-General: António Guterres
- Preceded by: Michelle Bachelet

Personal details
- Born: 27 August 1965 (age 61) Linz, Austria
- Education: Johannes Kepler University Linz; University of Vienna
- Occupation: Lawyer

Volker Türk (born 27 August 1965) is an Austrian lawyer and United Nations official. He has been the UN high commissioner for human rights since October 2022.

== Early life and education ==
Volker Türk was born on 27 August 1965 in Linz, Austria.

He attended the Linz Khevenhuller Gymnasium.

Türk received a Master of Laws from the Johannes Kepler University Linz. He received a doctorate in international law from the University of Vienna, where his doctoral dissertation was on the office of the United Nations High Commissioner for Refugees (UNHCR) and its mandate.

== Career ==
=== Early years ===
In 1991, Türk became a UN Junior Professional Officer and had a temporary assignment in Kuwait funded by the Austrian Foreign Ministry. He then held posts with the UNHCR in different regions of the world, including Malaysia, Kosovo, Bosnia-Herzegovina and the Democratic Republic of Congo. He later became the Director of the Division of International Protection at UNHCR headquarters in Geneva. In February 2015, he was appointed Assistant High Commissioner for Protection, making him the highest-ranking Austrian UN official; he played a role in the development of the Global Compact on Refugees.

On 18 April 2019, Türk was appointed by Secretary-General António Guterres to be Assistant Secretary-General for Strategic Coordination in the Executive Office of the Secretary-General at the UN Secretariat. From 2021 to 2022, he served as Under-Secretary-General for Policy in the Executive Office. Türk coordinated UN global policy work and follow-up to the Secretary-General’s “Call to Action for Human Rights” and report, "Our Common Agenda".

=== UN High Commissioner for Human Rights ===
==== 2022–2023 ====
Türk was selected to be the UN High Commissioner for Human Rights on 8 September 2022, and assumed office on 17 October 2022. His stated priorities include building a stronger UN human rights presence on the ground, and raising more money for a UN office that he said was underfunded.

He led the Human Rights 75 initiative in 2023, to advance women's and children's rights, support climate change mitigation, and empower people with disabilities. Türk promotes human rights as a solution to new challenges, such as the implications of digital technology on privacy and freedom of expression. In January that year, Türk criticized the "expedited removal" border policy of the administration of President Joe Biden and the United States under which non-citizens could be removed from the country or denied entry, saying it posed a risk to fundamental rights.

Türk called on Russian authorities in April to free the longtime Kremlin critic Vladimir Kara-Murza who had been sentenced to a 25-year prison sentence on charges including treason. The sentence is "another blow to the rule of law and civic space in the Russian Federation", said Türk. In May, Türk said Iran had an "abominable" track record of executions with an average of more than 10 people hanged each week. He called on Iranian authorities to abolish the death penalty.

In July 2023, after a man at an authorized protest in Stockholm, Sweden, tore pages from a Quran and set them on fire, Türk condemned the burning as an act designed to divide and provoke hatred. During a subsequent Human Rights Council debate, several Muslim-majority countries urged greater accountability for actions offensive to religious beliefs, while western countries and the EU emphasized the importance of freedom of expression and voiced opposition to blasphemy laws.

==== 2024–present ====
In February 2024, Türk criticized what he called India's "increasing restrictions on civic space ... as well as ... hate speech and discrimination against minorities, especially Muslims." India’s Ambassador to the UN at Geneva Arindam Bagchi said that Türk's accusations were "unwarranted and do not reflect the reality of the largest democracy in the world." In March, Türk said he recognised "China's advances in alleviating poverty and advancing development" and urged the release of human rights defenders, lawyers and others detained under the “picking quarrels and making trouble” legislation. He also called on China to implement the recommendations in the 2022 UN Human Rights Office report on Xinjiang.

The Arakan Army in Myanmar criticized what it perceived as a focus on the plight of Muslim communities in statements by Türk. However, Türk’s broader remarks consistently highlighted the suffering of all civilians affected by the civil war in Myanmar, including reports of indiscriminate airstrikes, summary executions, torture, and famine. In February 2025, addressing the UN Human Rights Council, he urged the international community to implement an arms embargo and targeted sanctions on Myanmar. He described the rights situation in Myanmar as one of the worst in the world with a “litany of human suffering,” including indiscriminate air-strikes, summary executions, torture, and famine.”

Türk visited Bangladesh in October 2024 to assess the human rights situation following political unrest which ousted the government of Sheikh Hasina. He met with Chief Adviser Muhammad Yunus, government officials, student leaders, and civil society representatives. Türk emphasized the importance of inclusivity, stating, "Bangladesh now has an historic opportunity to renew and revitalise a genuine democracy... and to rebuild your country on a foundation of equality – where every voice is heard and valued, irrespective of class, gender, race, political ideology or religion". He also visited hospitals to meet with students injured during the unrest and violence and called for "thorough investigations into all killings and human rights violations". The UN warned the Bangladesh Army that it could lose peacekeeping roles if it were involved in suppressing the July movement, said UN Human Rights Chief Volker Turk on BBC's HARDtalk.

On the Gaza genocide, Türk said Israel may – if intent were proven – be using starvation as a weapon of war in Gaza, which would amount to a war crime; Israel's economy minister, Nir Barkat, said Türk's warnings were "total nonsense – a totally irresponsible thing to say". In mid June 2025, Türk urged governments again to wake up to the suffering in Gaza.

"The current trajectory – of escalating conflict and blatant disregard for international human rights and humanitarian law – is indefensible."

Türk issued repeated and urgent warnings in late 2025 about the imminent risk of large-scale atrocities in El Fasher, Sudan, as the city was besieged and eventually seized by the Rapid Support Forces (RSF) militia. In January 2026, Türk condemned the human rights violations and the violent suppression of anti-government protests in Iran.

In July 2026, Türk was reappointed to a second term by the UNGA with 144 votes in favor and 10 against.

== Awards ==
In May 2016, Türk was awarded the University of Graz Human Rights Award for protecting refugees worldwide and to highlight the role of the UNDCR in supporting refugees.

== Publications ==
Türk is published on international refugee law, statelessness and human rights issues including in the International Journal of Refugee Law.

- Erika Feller, Volker Türk, Frances Nicholson (eds.): Refugee Protection in International Law. Cambridge University Press, Cambridge 2003, ISBN 0-521-53281-7.

Positions in intergovernmental organisations
Preceded by Michelle Bachelet	United Nations High Commissioner for Human Rights; 2022–present	Incumbent
