= Abdulfatai =

Abdulfatai is a given name. Notable people with the name include:

- Abdulfatai Buhari (born 1965), Nigerian politician
- Abdulfatai Yahaya Seriki (born 1975), Nigerian politician
