= YCP =

YCP may refer to:

- YCP Holdings, a Singapore-based holding company
- York College of Pennsylvania, a private college located in York, Pennsylvania, United States
- Young China Party, a political party in Taiwan
- YSR Congress Party, a political party in India
