= Miriam Olusanya =

Nigerian banker and business executive

Miriam Olusanya OON
- Education: Cranfield School of Management
- Alma mater: University of Ibadan; University of Liverpool
- Occupation: Banker
- Organization: Guaranty Trust Bank

Miriam Olusanya is the Managing Director of Guaranty Trust Bank, the first woman to ever hold the position. She assumed this position in July 2021.

== Education ==
Miriam Olusanya is a graduate of Pharmacy from the University of Ibadan. She holds a Master of Business Administration degree from the University of Liverpool.

== Career ==
Miriam joined GTB as an executive trainee in 1998 and held the position of Group Treasurer and Head of Wholesale Banking prior to her appointment as Managing Director of GTB, a position previously held by Segun Agbaje. She also serves on the Board of Guaranty Trust Bank (Gambia) Limited as a non-executive director.

== Awards and honours ==
In 2023, Olusanya was conferred with National award of Officer of the Order of the Niger (OON) by President Muhammadu Buhari.
