= GTBank Food and Drink Festival =

Annual food festival held in Lagos, Nigeria

GTBank Food and Drink
- Status: active
- Genre: Food festival
- Frequency: Annually
- Venue: Plot 1, Water Corporation Drive, Oniru,
- Locations: Victoria Island, Lagos
- Country: Nigeria
- Inaugurated: 2016

GTBank Food and Drink is a multi-day annual food festival sponsored by Guaranty Trust Bank hosted in Lagos. The maiden edition was held for two days in 2016 while subsequent annual events held for four days. At the event, buyers connect with sellers in the food and drink industry from different parts of Nigeria and other countries. Food exhibitors showcase and sell diverse food products ranging from fresh organic groceries to dry foods, confectionery, pastries, consumables, crockery, wine and champagnes.

Besides the exhibition, other aspects of the event includes culinary experiences such as food and wine tastings, cooking masterclasses with renowned international and Nigerian chefs, and musical entertainment. The venue has been held at Ligali Ayorinde, Water Corporation area of Oniru-Lekki, Victoria Island since its inception.

As Africa's largest food fair, the event has featured celebrity chefs and foodies from Nigeria and other parts of the world including Alex Oke, Gbubemi Fregene, Tiyan Alile, Ozoz Sokoh, Marcus Samuelsson and Phil Howard amongst others.
