= Segun Agbaje =

Nigerian businessman

Segun Julius Agbaje
- Born: Olusegun Agbaje; 1964 (age 61–62); Lagos State, Nigeria
- Education: St Gregory's College, Lagos; St Augustine Academy, Kent; University of San Francisco
- Occupations: Banker; entrepreneur
- Years active: 1991–present
- Known for: Guaranty Trust Holding Company (GTCO PLC) executive

Segun Julius Agbaje (born Olusegun Agbaje; 1964) is the Group Chief Executive Officer of Guaranty Trust Holding Company Plc (also known as GTCO PLC) a multinational financial services group, that offers retail and investment banking, pension management, asset management and payments services, headquartered in Victoria Island, Lagos, Nigeria. He is also a former Director of PepsiCo, retiring on May 7, 2026. He is a member of the Mastercard Advisory Board, Middle East and Africa.

== Education ==
Segun Agbaje attended St Gregory’s College, Obalende, Lagos State, Nigeria, and St Augustine Academy, Kent, England, for his secondary education. He then proceeded to University of San Francisco, California, where he earned Bachelor of Accounting and Master of Business Administration degrees.

== Career ==
Segun Agbaje started his career working for Ernst & Young in San Francisco and left in 1991 to join the startup GTBank. He rose through the ranks to become an Executive Director in January 2000, and Deputy Managing Director in August 2002.

Agbaje was appointed Group CEO of Guaranty Trust Holding Company in August 2021 after he stepped down from his role as Managing Director of Guaranty Trust Bank. Agbaje who was named substantive Managing Director of Guaranty Trust Bank in June 2011 following the death of Tayo Aderinokun, handed over the reins of the Bank to Miriam Olusanya in August 2021.

Agbaje was elected to the board of directors and audit committee of PepsiCo effective 15 July 2020.

Awards won by GTBank under Agbaje's leadership include Best Bank in Nigeria by Euromoney; African Bank of the Year by African Banker Award; Best Bank in Nigeria by World Finance UK; Most Innovative Bank by EMEA Finance; Best Banking Group by World Business Leader Magazine and Best Bank in Nigeria award by the Banker Awards.

== Personal life ==
Segun was born to Chief Julius Kosebinu Agbaje, a banker, and Mrs. Margaret Olabisi Agbaje, a teacher. His elder brother is People's Democratic Party Lagos politician, Jimi Agbaje.
