= Temiloluwa =

Nigerian given name

- Gender: Unisex
- Language: Yoruba

Origin
- Origin: Nigerian
- Meaning: "God is mine"
- Region of origin: South-west Nigeria

Other names
- Variant forms: Temi; Temilolu

TemiloluwaTemiloluwa is a Nigerian given name of Yoruba name origin meaning "God is mine" or "God belongs to me." Notable people with the given name include:

- Temi Otedola, born as Temiloluwa Elizabeth Otedola (born 1996) Nigerian actress
- Temiloluwa Prioleau, Nigerian computer scientist
- Temi Adesodun, born as Temiloluwa Adesodun (born 1997) Nigerian footballer
