= Ire Aderinokun =

Nigerian front end developer

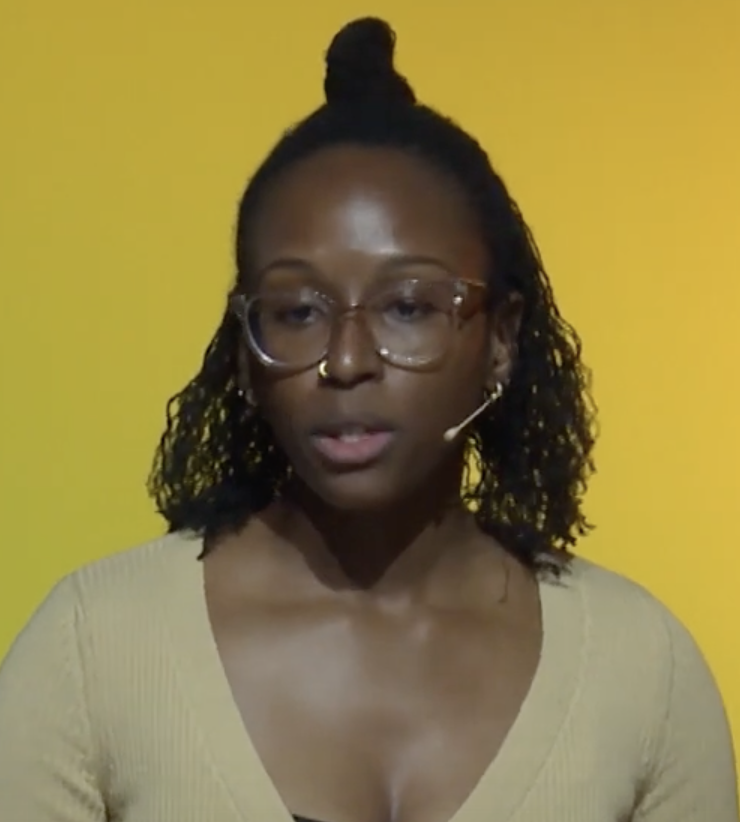
- Born: 2 March 1991 (age 35); Lagos, Nigeria
- Citizenship: Nigeria United Kingdom
- Education: University of Bristol
- Occupation: Website Developer
- Known for: Bitsofcode
- Notable work: She is Nigeria's first female Google Developer Expert
- Parents: Olutayo Aderinokun (father); Olunfunlola Aderinokun (mother)

Ire Aderinokun is a Nigerian front end developer and Google developer expert. She is Nigeria's first female Google Developer Expert.

== Early life and education ==
Ire is from Ogun state, Nigeria. She was born into the family of Tayo and Mrs. Olunfunlola Aderinokun.

After her secondary school education in Nigeria she got a bachelor's degree in Experimental Psychology from University of Bristol. While pursuing her master's degree in law at University of Bristol, her interests for computer science made her take a design course at Codecademy.

== Career ==
Ire is a self-taught frontend developer and user interface designer. She built her first website at the age of 13 as a fansite for Neopets where she had learned her first basic HTML codes. Ire also runs a blog called bitsofcode, where she breaks down coding tips to other developers. She started the blog in 2015.

Ire is a Google Developer Expert, specializing in the core front-end technologies HTML, CSS, and JavaScript. Ire is also an author at techcabal.

She organizes Frontstack, a conference for front-end engineering in Nigeria and started a small scholarship program to sponsor Nigerian women to take a Udacity Nanodegree in a technology-related field of their choice. She is the co-founder, COO and VP Engineering of Helicarrier, which builds cryptocurrency infrastructure for Africa.

Ire Aderinokun is one of the founding members of Feminist Coalition, a group of young Nigerian women with the aim of promoting equality for women in Nigerian society.

== See also ==
- Rita Orji
- Temiloluwa Prioleau
- Nonye Soludo
