= Tiyan Alile =

Nigerian chef

- Born: Benin, Edo Nigeria
- Citizenship: Nigerian American
- Education: L'Academie de Cuisine

Tiyan Alile is a Nigerian-American celebrity chef and restaurateur. She established Culinary Academy, the first culinary school in Nigeria. A few of her former restaurants include a grill at the Ibadan Golf Club and a modernized Nigerian restaurant. She is the current president of The Culinary Arts Practitioners Association in Nigeria, the founder and promoter of Culinary Academy and the Executive Chef of Tarragon, a fine dining restaurant and wine club. She has been involved in planning a number of events in the hospitality space and delivering masterclasses at the Fiesta of Flavours Food Fairs, the GTBank Food and Drink Fair, the Mzansi Culinary Festival (SA).

== Early life and education ==
Alile was born in Benin City to a physician father while her mother is a judge. After earning a bachelor's degree in law and working in business law for ten years, she branched into the food industry in 1993 building on her kitchen experiences with her mother, making cakes and barbecue grills. She went back to school in 2012 to train in the culinary arts at the L'Academie de Cuisine.

== Career ==
In high school, Alile had a cupcake store called Tea Time Cupcakes. She officially began working in the culinary arts in 1999 when she started a grill house at Ibadan Golf Club named Tees Hot Bites. Four years later, in 2003, she opened up a Nigerian restaurant called Matchsticks Concepts while she was a food columnist for Genevieve Magazine. In 2015, Tiyan launched her restaurant called Tarragon (named after her favorite spice), which originally started out as a dinner club.

=== Writing ===
Alile is the author of the book, Tale in a pie, which has been described as "the most scandalous story cook book out there". The book was launched on May 5, 2017 she since has organized various book reading events both locally and internationally.

=== Teaching ===
In 2007, Alile began to teach cooking and established Nigeria's first culinary school Culinary Academy in 2012 based in Lagos, Nigeria. The culinary arts education meets international standards while focusing on Nigeria's diverse cuisine. She is also the president of Culinary Arts Practitioners Association of Nigeria. Tiyan has taught master-classes at the Central Johannesburg College and has also trained one of the students at her academy who was invited to participate in the 2016 Young Chef Olympiad in India At the 2016 edition of the GTBank Food and Drink Fair, Tiyan, along with other top chefs, taught young and aspiring chefs new culinary skills. In 2017, she launched her "brainchild" project, the African Young Chefs Competition (AYCC), a platform for young African chefs with a focus on African indigenous cuisine on an international scale.

== Charity and campaigning ==
Alile served as the president to the Rotary club of Victoria Island East from 2013 to 2014.

== Awards and recognition ==
Alile has won several awards, including the Luxury Travel Guide Best Restaurant awards, World Luxury Restaurant Award for fine dining and food presentation and the World Chefs Global Connect.
