= Guaranty Trust Bank (Kenya) =

Kenyan commercial group

Guaranty Trust Bank (Kenya) Ltd
- Company type: Commercial Bank
- Industry: Banking
- Founded: 1986
- Headquarters: Nairobi, Kenya
- Key people: Dhanu Hansraj Chandaria (Chairman), Jubril Adeniji (Managing Director)
- Products: Loans, Savings, Transaction accounts, Investments, Debit Cards, Credit Cards Business Banking, Personal Banking, E-Channels, Treasury Services
- Total assets: US$242.2 million (KES:20.94 billion) (2010)
- Number of employees: 300+
- Parent: Guaranty Trust Bank (70%)
- Website: gtbank.co.ke

Guaranty Trust Bank (Kenya) Ltd, commonly referred to as GTBank Kenya, is a commercial bank in Kenya and a subsidiary of the Nigerian Guaranty Trust Bank Plc. It is licensed by the Central Bank of Kenya, the central bank and national banking regulator.

The bank provides banking services with focus on Corporate Banking, SME Banking, Personal Banking, Private Banking and Treasury Services.

As of December 2022, the bank's total assets were KES 54.23 billion and profitability was KES 753.29 million.

== History ==
The bank was founded in Nairobi, in 1986, as Finance International Limited, a "Non-Banking Financial Institution" (NBFI). The name of the institution was later changed to the Finance Institution of Africa (FINA). In 1991 the company changed ownership. In 1995, the Central Bank of Kenya, the country's banking regulator, changed the banking laws, requiring all NBFI's to convert to commercial banks or close shop. To comply with the law, FINA converted to a commercial bank, Fina Bank (Kenya) Limited, in February 1996.

Between 2005 and 2008, Fina Bank Kenya established subsidiaries in Rwanda and Uganda, forming the Fina Bank Group.

In 2013 Guaranty Trust Bank of Nigeria, acquired 70% shareholding in Fina Bank Group for a cash consideration of US$100 million. In January 2014, Fina Bank Kenya and her subsidiaries rebranded to reflect the change in ownership. In February 2014, Fina Bank Group rebranded to Guaranty Trust Bank (East Africa).

== See also ==
- GTBank EA
- GTBank Rwanda
- GTBank Uganda
- Kenya Banks
- Kenya Economy
