= Rita Orji =

Nigerian computer scientist

Rita Oluchi Orji
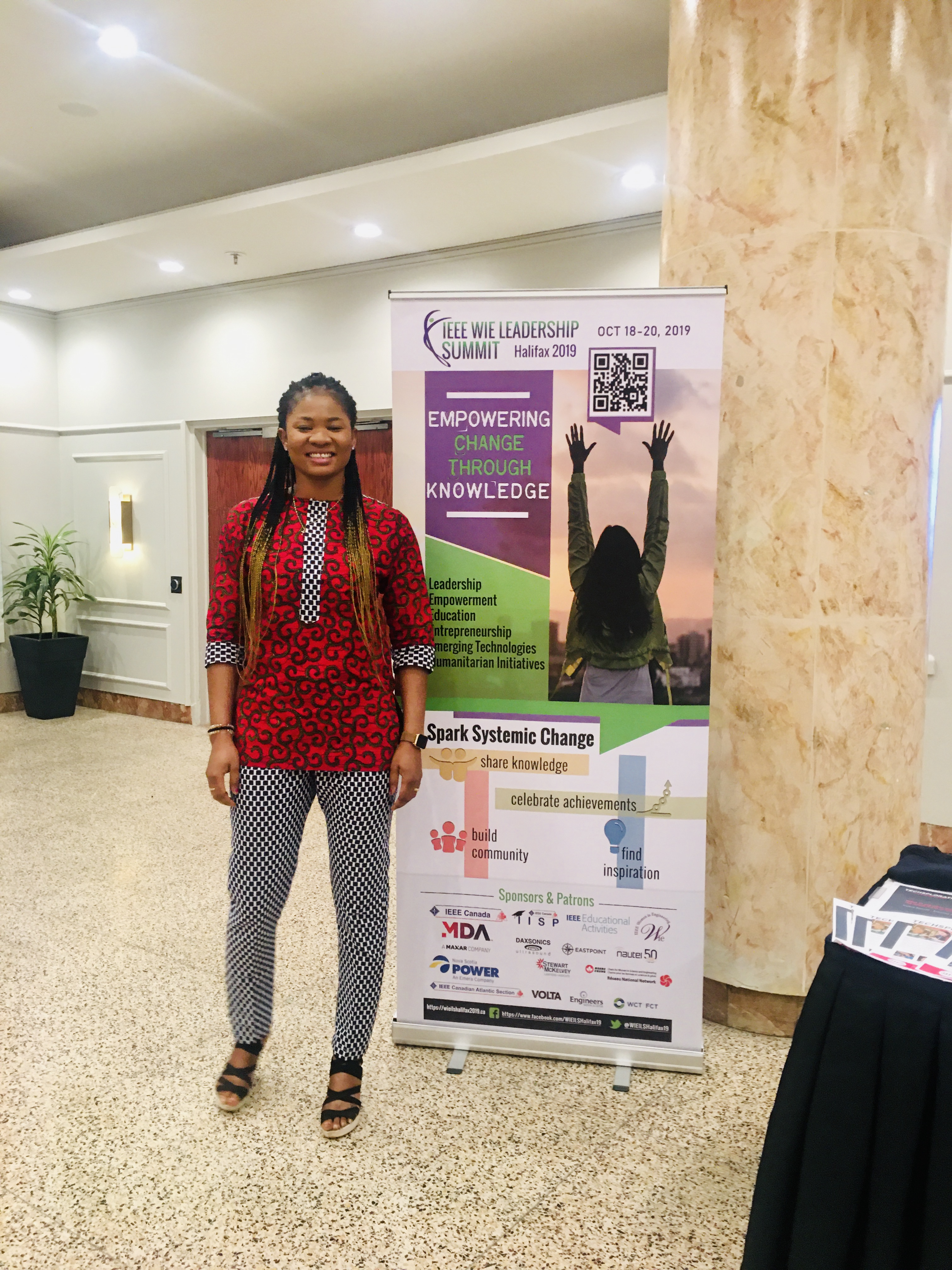
- Born: Owelli, Enugu State, Nigeria
- Citizenship: Nigerian-Canadian
- Education: Nnamdi Azikiwe University (BSc); Middle East Technical University (MSc); University of Saskatchewan (PhD)
- Known for: Persuasive computing, digital health, culturally adaptive technology, AI for social good, STEM diversity and women's empowerment
- Awards: NSERC Arthur B. McDonald Fellowship (2024); Fellow, African Academy of Sciences (2025); Member, Royal Society of Canada (2020); Canada Research Chair in Persuasive Technology (2020); Member, Global Young Academy (2022)
- Scientific career
- Fields: Human-computer interaction, Persuasive technology, Responsible AI, Digital health
- Workplaces: Dalhousie University
- Website: web.cs.dal.ca/~orji/

Rita Orji is a Nigerian-Canadian computer scientist, Full Professor, and Canada Research Chair in Persuasive Technology at Dalhousie University. where she directs the Persuasive Computing Lab. She is a Fellow of the African Academy of Sciences and a member of both the Royal Society of Canada College and the Global Young Academy. In February 2026, she was appointed by the United Nations General Assembly to the Independent International Scientific Panel on Artificial Intelligence, a 40-member body established under the Global Digital Compact as the first global scientific body dedicated to assessing AI's impact on societies and economies. She also addressed a United Nations panel about the status of women and at the Parliament of Canada.. She has received more than 100 awards and recognitions from national and international organizations.

Orji's research focuses on human-computer interaction, persuasive technology, and responsible AI, with particular emphasis on designing interactive systems for underserved populations and the Global South. She has published over 400 peer-reviewed papers, received more than 11,000 citations, and has been consistently ranked among the world's top 2% of scientists by Stanford University. She is panel member of the UN Independent International Scientific Panel on AI.

== Early life and education ==
Orji grew up in Enugu State Nigeria. She is Igbo by tribe. She was raised by parents, Maria and Okonkwo Orji, who never attended school, in a remote town called Owelli with no electricity and pipe-borne water. She is one of nine siblings and her parents supported the family through peasant farming. Orji did not have access to a computer growing up, and was admitted to study Computer Science at Nnamdi Azikiwe University without having used a computer. She graduated top of her class with First Class Honours. During her secondary education, she entered the Nigerian team for the International Mathematical Olympiad. In 2002, she launched "Education for Women and the Less Privileged in Nigeria", a nonprofit organisation that provides mentorship and scholarships for women in education. Orji joined a master's program at Middle East Technical University, where she was the only African student in class. She completed her master's in 2009 and moved to Canada as a graduate student.

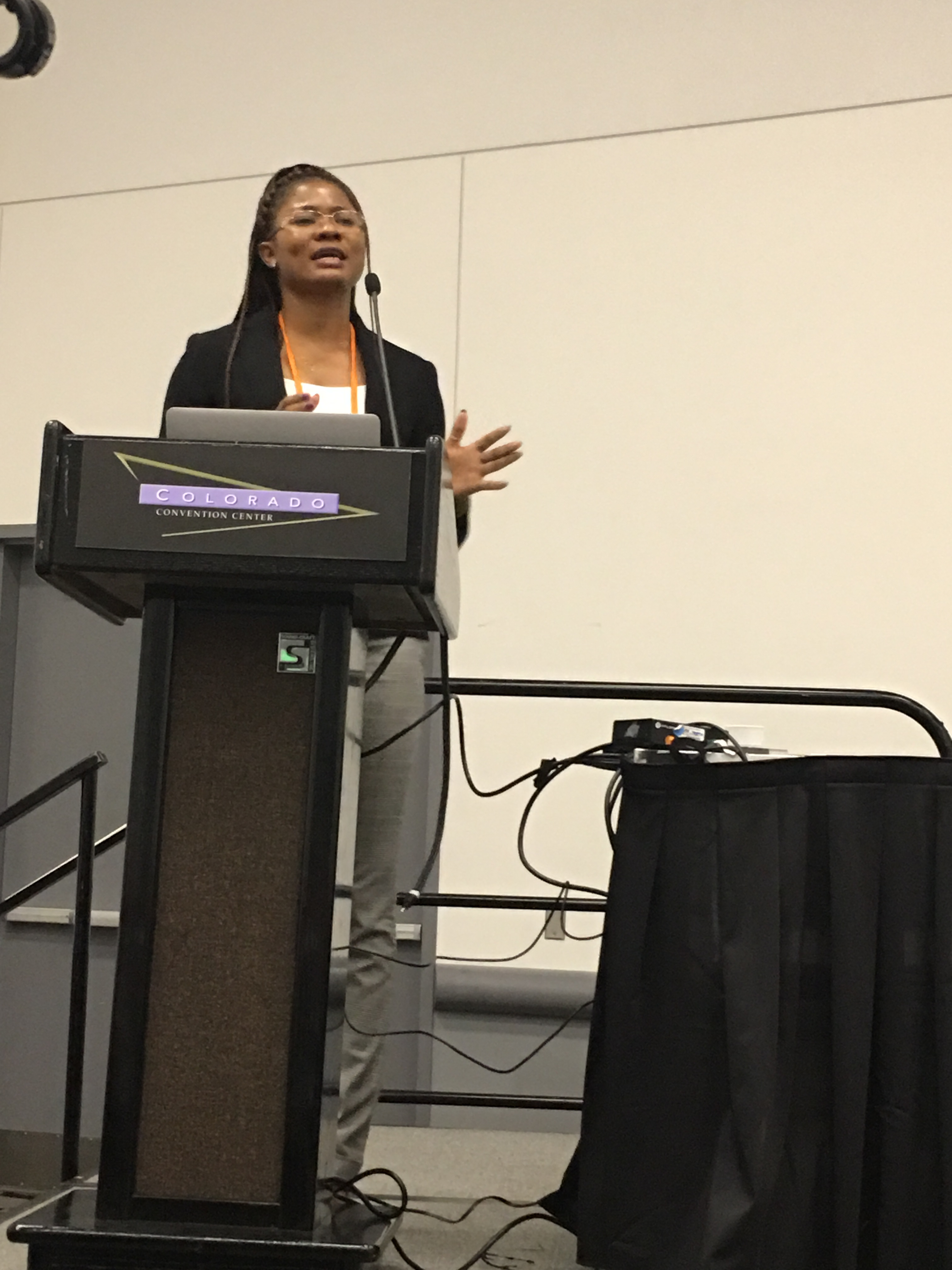
Dr. Rita Orji in 2017 in Colorado

In 2012, Orji presented at the Parliament of Canada, where she spoke about health promotion and disease prevention. She was awarded a Vanier scholarship from the Natural Sciences and Engineering Research Council. Orji earned her PhD at University of Saskatchewan in 2014. She was the first woman from her town of 50,000 people to earn a PhD. She joined McGill University as a postdoctoral fellow, where she worked on technological interventions that can effect behavioural change.

== Career ==
Orji joined the Games Institute at the University of Waterloo as a Banting Fellow in 2016. She is interested in persuasive technology and how to design technologies that can promote health and wellness and technologies for promoting social and public goods. Orji joined the Faculty of Computer Science at Dalhousie University as an assistant professor in 2017. She designs interactive systems and persuasive technologies, particularly to benefit under-served populations. She has studied how culture and age influence the efficacy of persuasive technologies. She analysed how reward, competition, social comparison and social learning differ between men and women in collectivist and individualist cultures, finding that in collectivist cultures, men are more susceptible to reward and competition.

In February 2026, Orji was appointed by the United Nations General Assembly to the Independent International Scientific Panel on Artificial Intelligence, serving a three-year term. The Panel was established by General Assembly resolution in August 2025 under the Global Digital Compact as the first global scientific body dedicated to AI, tasked with producing annual evidence-based scientific assessments of AI's opportunities, risks, and societal impacts. The 40 panel members were selected from more than 2,600 applicants across over 140 countries, following independent review by the International Telecommunication Union, the UN Office for Digital and Emerging Technologies, and UNESCO.

Orji was the only Nigerian appointed to the panel and one of only two Canadians, alongside Turing Award recipient Yoshua Bengio. Her appointment reflected her expertise in human-centred, equitable, and responsible AI, and her research on how AI systems influence human behaviour across diverse cultural contexts.

== Advocacy and engagement ==
Orji is a Science, Technology, Engineering, and Mathematics (STEM) diversity ambassador, working towards increased participation of women and minorities in computing, including using herself as a practical example. She is passionate about youth empowerment and women's access to education. She was honoured by hEr VOLUTION as one of the top 150 women scientists in Canada. She attended the UN Commission on the Status of Women in New York City. She spoke at the 2018 United Nations Commission on the Status of Women (CSW62) Panel: It is Up to Me.

== Awards and honours ==
- 2013 University of Saskatchewan Research Excellence in Science Award/
- 2017 Enugu State Award of Excellence in Recognition of Scholarly Achievement and Contributions to Advancement of Education
- 2017 Nnamdi Azikiwe University Award of Excellence in Recognition of Contribution for the Advancement of Knowledge in Computer Science.
- 2017 Top 150 Canadian Women in Science, Technology, Engineering, and Mathematics (STEM)
- 2018 Women Leaders in the Digital Economy Award, Digital Nova Scotia.
- 2019 Dalhousie University President's Research Excellence Award.
- 2019 International Society for Research on Internet Interventions Rising Star Award.
- 2020 Canada Research Chair in Persuasive Technology.
- 2020 Inducted into the Royal Society of Canada College of New Scholars, Artists and Scientists.
- 2021 Top 100 Canada's Most Powerful Women
- 2021 Top 100 Leading Nigerian Women
- 2021 Top 25 Canadian Immigrant Awards
- 2021 Outstanding Young Computer Science Researcher Awards
- 2021 Nova Scotia Discovery Centre Emerging Professional Award
- 2022 Admitted into the Global Young Academy
- 2022 100 Accomplished Black Canadian Women
- 2024 Women in Technology Excellence Award
- 2024 Arthur B. McDonald Fellow
- 2025 TechForward: Thinking Forward Award
- 2025 President’s Research Excellence Awards for Research Impact
- 2025 Fellow of the African Academy of Sciences
- 2026 First United Nations Independent International Scientific Panel on AI Member

== See also ==
- Florence Seriki
- Confidence Staveley
- Temiloluwa Prioleau
