= Guaranty Trust Bank (Rwanda) =

Rwandan commercial bank

Guaranty Trust Bank (Rwanda) plc
- Company type: Subsidiary
- Industry: Financial services
- Headquarters: Kigali, Rwanda
- Key people: Francoise Kagoyire; Chairperson; Yusuf Ayokunle; Managing Director
- Products: Loans, Checking, Savings, Investments, Debit Cards
- Revenue: ▲ Pretax: US$6.402million (RWF:6.463billion) (Q4:2021)
- Total assets: US$ 131.309million (RWF:132.571billion) (Q4:2021)
- Parent: Guaranty Trust Holding Company PLC
- Website: gtbank.co.rw

Guaranty Trust Bank (Rwanda) plc, commonly referred to as GTBank Rwanda, is one of the licensed commercial banks in the Republic of Rwanda. It has been part of Nigerian Guaranty Trust Bank since 2013.

As of December 2020, Guaranty Trust Bank (Rwanda) plc had an estimated asset base of US$131.309million (RWF:132.571billion).

== History ==
The beginnings of the bank in Rwanda can be traced to 1983, when the BACAR bank was established. It became one of the first privately owned commercial banks in the country. Sometime before 2004, BACAR was taken over by the National Bank of Rwanda, the country's central bank, because of managerial issues. In 2004, Fina Bank, at that time, a Kenyan commercial bank, acquired BACAR. In 2008, Fina Bank opened banking operations in Uganda as well, forming the Fina Bank Group.

In 2013, Guaranty Trust Bank (Kenya) ltd acquired 70 percent shareholding in the Fina Bank Group for a cash payment of US$100 million. In January 2014, the bank rebranded to reflect the new ownership structure.

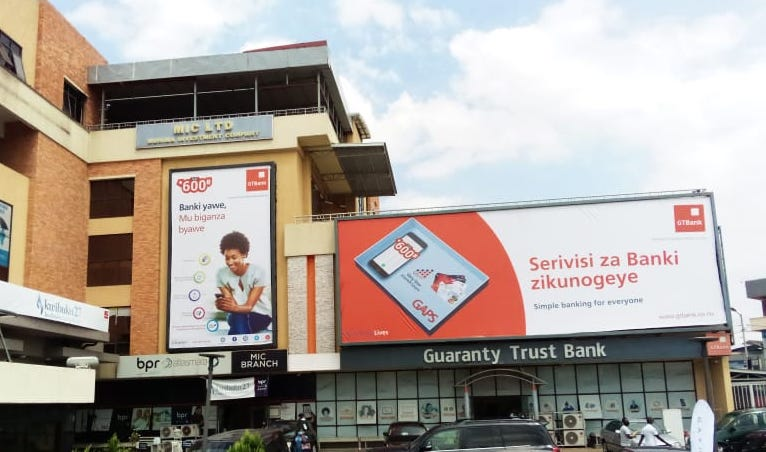
GTBank Rwanda current Headquarters

== Branch network ==
As of December 2022, GTBank Rwanda maintained branches at the following locations:

1. Main Branch - KN 2 Ave, 1370, MIC Building Kigali
2. Gisozi Branch - Gasabo, Kigali
3. Muhanga Branch - Muhanga, Southern Province
4. Kayonza Branch - Kayonza, Eastern Province
5. Ngoma Branch - Ngoma, Eastern Province
6. Karongi Branch - Karongi, Western Province
7. Kicukiro Branch - Kicukiro, Kigali
8. Kigali City Market Branch - Nyarugenge, Kigali
9. Kimironko Branch - Gasabo Kigali
10. Nyabugogo Branch - Nyarugenge, Kigali
11. Remera Branch - Gasabo, Kigali
12. Rubavu Branch - Rubavu, Northern Province
13. Musanze Branch - Musanze, Northern Province
14. Rusizi Branch - Rusizi, Western Province

== See also ==
- List of banks in Rwanda
- Economy of Rwanda
- Guaranty Trust Bank (Uganda)
- Guaranty Trust Bank (Kenya)
- Fina Bank Group
