= GTCO Group =

Multinational financial services group

Guaranty Trust Holding Company plc
- Type: Public limited company
- Traded as: LSE: GRTB
- ISIN: 0478224264
- Industry: Finance
- Founded: 17 January 1990
- Headquarters: 635 Akin Adesola Street, Victoria Island, Lagos, Nigeria
- Area served: Côte d'Ivoire, Kenya, Liberia, Gambia, Ghana, Nigeria, Rwanda, Tanzania, Uganda, United Kingdom
- Key people: Hezekiah Oyinlola, (Chairman) Segun Agbaje, (Group CEO)
- Products: Retail banking Commercial banking Corporate banking
- Services: Banking, Payments, pension management, asset management
- Revenue: ▲ ₦531.08 billion (2023)
- Operating income: ▲ ₦609.31 billion (2023)
- Net income: ▲ ₦539.65 billion (2023)
- Total assets: ▲ ₦9.69 trillion (2023)
- Total equity: ▲ ₦1.48 trillion (2023)
- Number of employees: 3387 (2023)
- Website: www.gtcoplc.com

Guaranty Trust Holding Company PLC also known as GTCO PLC is a Nigerian multinational financial services group, that offers retail and investment banking, pension management, asset management and payments services, headquartered in Victoria Island, Lagos, Nigeria. GTCO Plc was created in July 2021 following the corporate reorganization of Guaranty Trust Bank PLC (or GTBank) into a Holding Company.

GTCO Plc's reorganisation means it will now offer more services beyond banking; with a payments business being top of mind for the group. Under its old structure, it could not have run non-lending businesses because a 2010 regulation by the Central Bank of Nigeria (CBN) mandated banks to stop operating their non-banking subsidiaries. They either had to divest from non-core lending service or restructure as a holdings company.

Its new businesses include payments, pension management, asset management, and its existing banking business. GTCO's banking subsidiary in Nigeria, Guaranty Trust Bank Limited is Nigeria’s most valuable bank by market value with its most recent market valuation at N840.26 billion.

Guaranty Trust Holding Plc original started as Guaranty Trust Banks, and it was founded in 1988 by over 35 young Nigerians in their thirties, spearheaded mostly by Tayo Aderinokun and Fola Adeola, but also included Femi Pedro, Gbolade Osibodu, Femi Akingbe, Akin Opeodu, and others.

== History ==
Guaranty Trust Bank Plc was established in 1990 as a limited liability company (LLC) regulated by the Central Bank of Nigeria to provide commercial and other banking services to Nigerians. The bank began operations as a commercial bank in 1991. The Bank inaugurated its first Head Office on 11 February 1991, at The Plaza, Adeyemo Alakija, Victoria Island, Lagos. In 1992, the Bank opened two branches in Lagos (Ikeja and Broad Street), as well as its first upcountry branch in Kano, and a Port-Harcourt branch in 1993.

In September 1996, Guaranty Trust Bank plc became a publicly traded corporation and received the President's Merit Award from the Nigerian Stock Exchange. The Bank received a universal banking license in February 2002 and was later designated as a settlement bank by the Central Bank of Nigeria (CBN) in 2003. In the same year, it incorporated subsidiaries in the Gambia and Sierra Leone.

Guaranty Trust Bank undertook its second share offering in 2004 and raised over ₦11 billion from Nigerian Investors to expand its operations.

On 26 July 2007, GTBank became the very first Subsaharan bank and first Nigerian joint stock company to be listed on London Stock Exchange and Deutsche Börse. The IPO raised US$750,000,000. In the same year, they successfully placed Nigeria's first private Eurobond issue on the international capital markets.

The GTBank US$500,000,000 Eurobond was the first-ever Benchmark Eurobond issue by a Nigerian corporate and the second Eurobond programme by GTBank in the last 5 years.

The long-term debts of Guaranty Trust Bank plc are rated BB- by Standard & Poor's and AA− by Fitch Ratings, which are the highest ratings for a Nigerian bank.

They introduced online banking and SMS banking in Nigeria and a naira denominated MasterCard as well as the Platinum and World Signia cards and with GTB-on-wheels, mobile branches.

On 12 March 2008, GTBank was given a banking licence for the United Kingdom by the Financial Services Authority.

Guaranty Trust Bank Limited is a partner of Eko Atlantic City, a newly made island (820 ha.) in the Atlantic ocean, adjacent to Victoria Island, Lagos. It will be the home of the new Financial District. The building of Eko Atlantic City started in 2009 and was expected to be finished in 2016.

To commemorate the bank's 20th anniversary, the Nigerian Postal Service issued a set of GTBank Anniversary postage stamps. This was the first time in Nigeria that a corporate organization was honored in such a way.

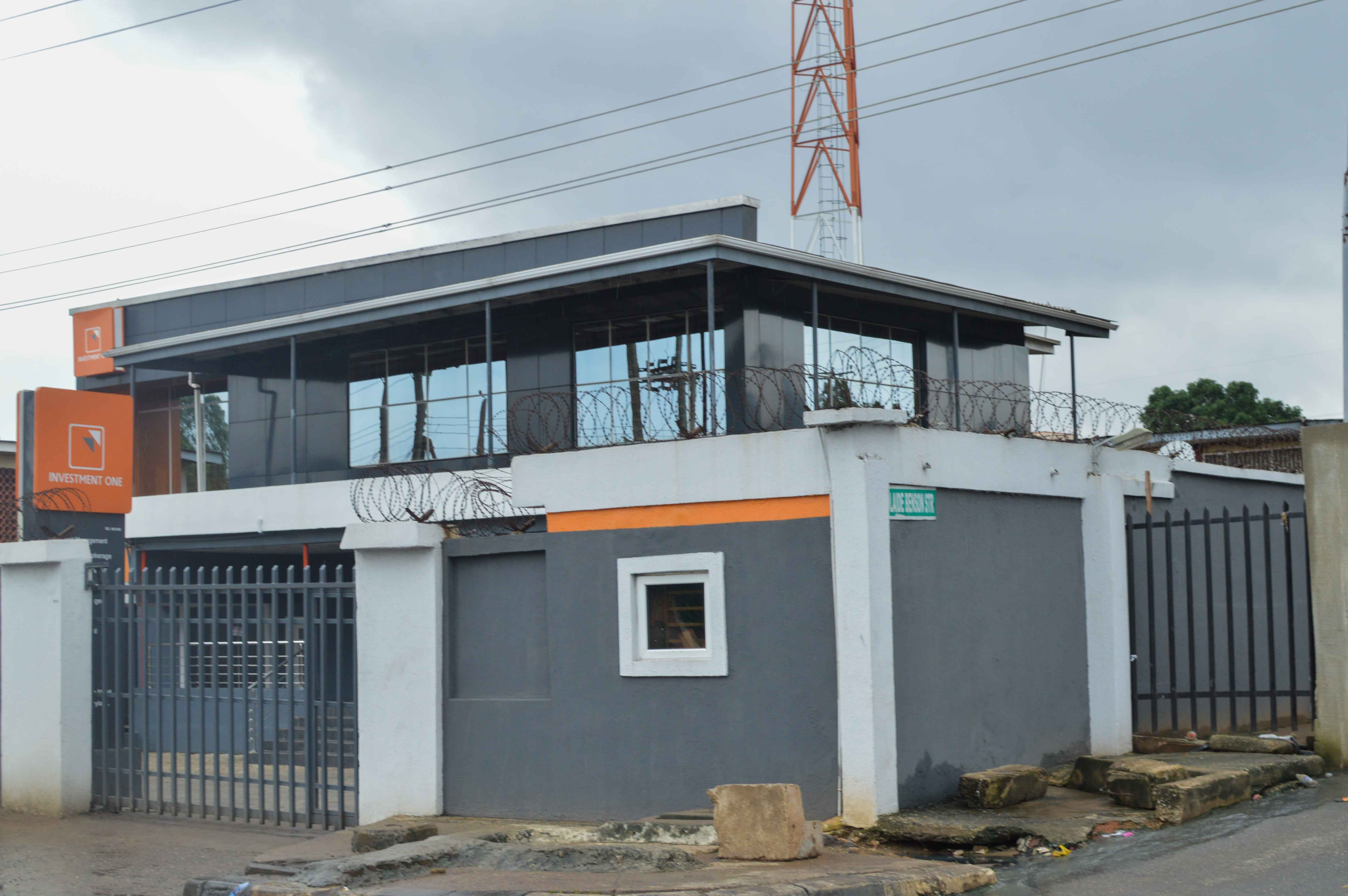
Gtbank, Maryland branch, Lagos

In 2011, the bank became the biggest bank in Nigeria by market capitalisation.

In 2013, the bank acquired a 70 percent shareholding in the Fina Bank Group for a cash payment of US$100 million. Fina Bank branches and subsidiaries were rebranded GT Bank soon afterwards.

In 2013, the Bank issued a US$400,000,000 Euro bond at a coupon rate of 6%; the least obtained by a Nigerian company in the international capital market. The Eurobond was issued under the US$2,000,000 Global Medium Term Note Programme, which is registered under both Regulation in the United States of America and Rule 144A in the United Kingdom and sold to investors across Africa, America, Asia and Europe.

The Bank has over 10,000 employees.

In May 2021, GT Bank announced a change in its corporate structure, moving to a holding company and spinning off its banking and other businesses into subsidiaries. The proposed change was ratified by its shareholders on 4 December 2020 after a court mandated shareholders meeting.

== Controversy ==
Innoson and GTB have been embroiled in court battles for a long time over a financial contract. On 29 March 2019, the Supreme Court ordered GT Bank to pay Innoson motors the sum of ₦8.8 billion as a result of an accrued interest.

In an exclusive report, Peoples Gazette, through bank records, disclosed how GTCO, through its subsidiary Investment One, donated the sum of ₦200 million to the campaign account of Vice President Yemi Osinbajo, in violation of the federal campaign finance law. The payment was made in three tranches of ₦100 million, ₦50 million, and ₦50 million. The electoral act permits a maximum donation of ₦1 million per candidate in a presidential race.

== Leadership ==
Ibrahim Hassan is chairman; Segun Agbaje is Group Chief Executive Officer. The other board of directors include; Catherine Echeozo, Suleiman Barau, Helen Lee Bouygues, and Adebanji Adeniyi. In 2015, Osaretin Demuren became the first female Chairman of the GTCO. In 2021, Miriam Olusanya was appointed the first female Managing Director of GTBank Nigeria, the flagship company of GTCO Plc.

== Subsidiaries ==
Guaranty Trust Holding Company Plc has 11 banking subsidiaries with payments, asset management, and pension management subsidiaries.

GTCO PLC has subsidiaries in the following countries:

1. GTBank Nigeria - Lagos, Nigeria
2. HabariPay - Lagos, Nigeria
3. GT Pensions - Lagos, Nigeria
4. GT Fund Managers - Lagos, Nigeria
5. GTBank Kenya - Nairobi, Kenya
6. GTBank Rwanda - Kigali, Rwanda
7. GTBank Uganda - Kampala, Uganda
8. GTBank Côte d'Ivoire - Abidjan, Ivory Coast
9. GTBank Gambia - Banjul, Gambia (The Gambia)
10. GTBank Ghana - Accra, Ghana
11. GTBank Liberia - Monrovia, Liberia
12. GTBank Sierra Leone - Freetown, Sierra Leone
13. GTBank UK - London, England, United Kingdom
14. GTBank Tanzania - Dar es Salaam, Tanzania

== Corporate social responsibility ==
Guaranty Trust Bank has a long history of corporate social responsibility projects, often gaining recognition for its CSR efforts.

Its Annual Autism Conference, which it has held for eleven years, works to reduce the stigma associated with autism. The event also provides free speech and behavioral consultations with medical experts for people living with autism.

In education and sports, Guaranty Trust Bank also hosts the Master's Cup, one of the most popular grassroots football tournaments in the country. In 2021, the Bank celebrated Children's day with a meeting between young children and Mabel Segun, the iconic Nigerian poet and playwright.

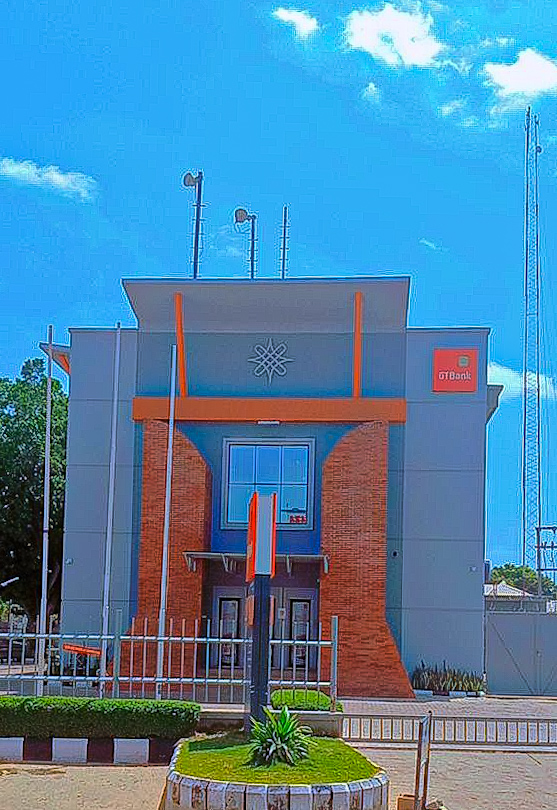
Guaranty Trust Bank Plc branch in Kaduna State, Nigeria

The bank has other CSR efforts in improving access to healthcare, and it hosts the GTBank Food and Drink Festival and the GTBank Fashion Week, two of the most popular pop culture events in Nigeria.

== Awards and recognition ==
In July 2019, GTBank was recognized as the best bank in Africa at the annual Euromoney Awards for Excellence held in London. In the same year, it was adjudged the best bank in Nigeria for the ninth time.

In 2020, Guaranty Trust Bank was awarded the Euromoney Excellence in Leadership Africa Award and was also named the Best Bank in Nigeria by Euromoney in 2020 and Africa's best Bank by the same publication in 2021.

Guaranty Trust Bank was also named the Best Digital Bank in Nigeria by the research and credit rating agency, Agusto & Co. The bank was also the most admired finance brand in Nigeria and Africa in 2020.

In 2021, Guaranty Trust Bank was named the Best Banking Group, the Best Retail Bank in Nigeria and the Most Innovative Bank in Nigeria by the World Finance Banking Awards. The World Business Outlook awarded Guaranty Trust Bank the Best Digital Bank as well as an award for the Best Mobile Banking app. In 2022, GTBank also won the most admired brand in Africa Award.

In 2022, it was named the Most Socially Responsible Bank by the World Business Outlook, while in 2023, it got the best Bank in Nigeria awarded by the Global finance.

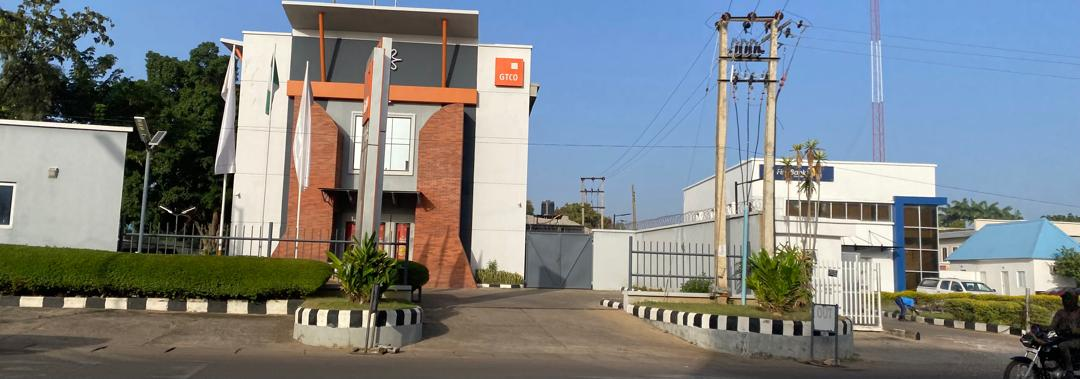
Picture of a commercial institute
