= IFSEC International =

- Status: Active
- Genre: Security
- Venue: ExCeL London
- Location: London
- Country: United Kingdom
- Inaugurated: 1974
- Most recent: June 2019
- Next event: 12–14 July 2021
- Attendance: 34,756 (2019)
- Organizer: Informa Markets
- Website: www.ifsec.events/international/

IFSEC International is an annual trade fair and conference for the global security industry. Organised by Informa Markets, it is held at ExCeL London alongside FIREX International, Safety & Health Expo and Facilities Show. It was launched in London in 1974, hosting British and international security professionals, suppliers and organisations.

IFSEC International is one of the largest events in its industry. In 2018 it hosted more than 27,350 visitors including 500 exhibitors, representing physical security, cybersecurity and integrated security. Its seminar programme was chaired by journalist Frank Gardner.

The event is supported by security industry associations SSAIB, ASIS International, British Security Industry Association, Fire & Security Association, International Professional Security Association, National Security Inspectorate and the Electrical Contractors' Association.

IFSEC has been organizing awards for "IFSEC Global Influencers in Security and Fire". The categories for 2021, include :

- Security executives
- Security – end users
- Security – manufacturers/vendors/installers/integrators
- Security – thought leadership
- Security – One to watch
- Cyber security professionals and thought leaders
- Fire – all disciplines (UK only)
