= Global Digital Compact =

United Nations initiative for a responsible and inclusive digital environment

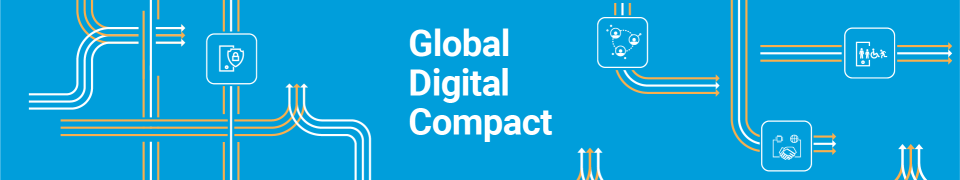
- Abbreviation: GDC
- Legal status: Active
- Headquarters: New York
- UN Secretary-General: António Guterres
- Parent organization: United Nations
- Website: www.un.org/techenvoy/global-digital-compact

The Global Digital Compact (GDC) is a comprehensive global framework for digital cooperation and governance of digital technologies and artificial intelligence proposed in the United Nations secretary-general António Guterres's Common Agenda. Its objective is to ensure that digital technologies are used responsibly and benefit all, while addressing the digital divide and fostering a safe and inclusive digital environment.

Although the compact is non-binding for those involved, it is thought to be a step towards addressing pressing digital challenges on a global scale.

The Global Digital Compact is part of the Pact for the Future, which was discussed and adopted at the UN Summit of the Future in September 2024, and builds upon the UN Charter and the 2030 Agenda for Sustainable Development.

== Origins ==
Following consultations with over 1 million people from around the world, the UN Member States adopted a declaration that emphasized the importance of improving digital cooperation during its 75th anniversary in 2020. In response in 2021, the Secretary-General's report "Our Common Agenda" commented on the upcoming challenges of digital technologies and consequent inequalities. The report proposed a Summit of the Future, with a technology track leading to a Global Digital Compact.

== Development ==
On 17 January 2023, the President of the UN General Assembly appointed Rwanda (and later replaced by Zambia) and Sweden as co-facilitators to lead the intergovernmental and private sector process on the Global Digital Compact. A road map for the process was published on January 16, 2023.

As part of the consultative process, the United Nations invited input from individuals, groups, associations, organizations, and entities to help shape the Global Digital Compact. These discussions provided informed deliberations that took place in September 2024 as part of the larger Summit of the Future. Russia attempted to defer the pact's adoption, but the action was ultimately rejected and the GDC's text was finalized and adopted.

== Key aspects ==
The Global Digital Compact aims to bring together governments, private sector entities, civil society organizations, and other stakeholders to work collaboratively on a set of shared principles and commitments. Some key aspects of the Global Digital Compact include:

1. Connectivity: Ensuring that all people, including schools, have access to the internet and digital tools for connectivity and socio-economic prosperity.
2. Internet Fragmentation: Preventing the division and fragmentation of the internet to maintain a unified global digital space.
3. Data Protection: Providing individuals with options for how their data is used and ensuring their privacy is respected.
4. Human Rights Online: Applying human rights principles in the digital sphere, including freedom of expression, privacy, and protection from discrimination and misleading content.
5. Artificial Intelligence Regulation: Promoting the ethical development and use of artificial intelligence in alignment with shared global values.
6. Digital Commons: Recognizing digital technologies as a global public good and encouraging their development and use for the benefit of all.
7. Sustainable Digital Development: Encouraging green technology and eco-friendly digital infrastructure to ensure digital transformation supports global environment goals.
8. Cybersecurity & Trust: Building global mechanisms for cybersecurity, combating cybercrime, and ensuring digital trust, especially in cross-border data and online safety.

The Global Digital Compact has the following five objectives, which guide its framework for digital cooperation into practice:

1. Develop digital infrastructure by closing all digital divides and accelerate progress across the Sustainable Development Goals (SDGs);
2. Expand sustainable benefits of the digital economy for all;
3. Foster an inclusive, open, safe and secure digital space and data privacy that respects, protects, and promote human rights;
4. Combat digital misinformation from the collaboration between governments and technology companies;
5. Enhance international governance of artificial intelligence and interoperable data governance approaches for the benefit of humanity.

== Relation to other initiatives ==
The Global Digital Compact is related to various other international efforts, such as the Sustainable Development Goals, the UN Secretary-General's Roadmap on Digital Cooperation, and the Partner2Connect Digital Coalition. The International Panel on the Information Environment was also launched at the UN Summit for the Future in September 2024. It provides independent scientific evidence for digital policy that has the objectives of the Global Digital Compact, while remaining arm's length from governments and the UN system.

== Concerns ==
Some concerns about the compact include its large scope and challenge of translating its principles into practice.
