= International Institute of Hotel Management =

- Dare To Do
- Established: 1994 (32 years ago)
- Founder: Dr Suborno Bose
- Location: 8 cities in India | 2 International Cities
- Language: English
- Website: www.iihm.ac.in

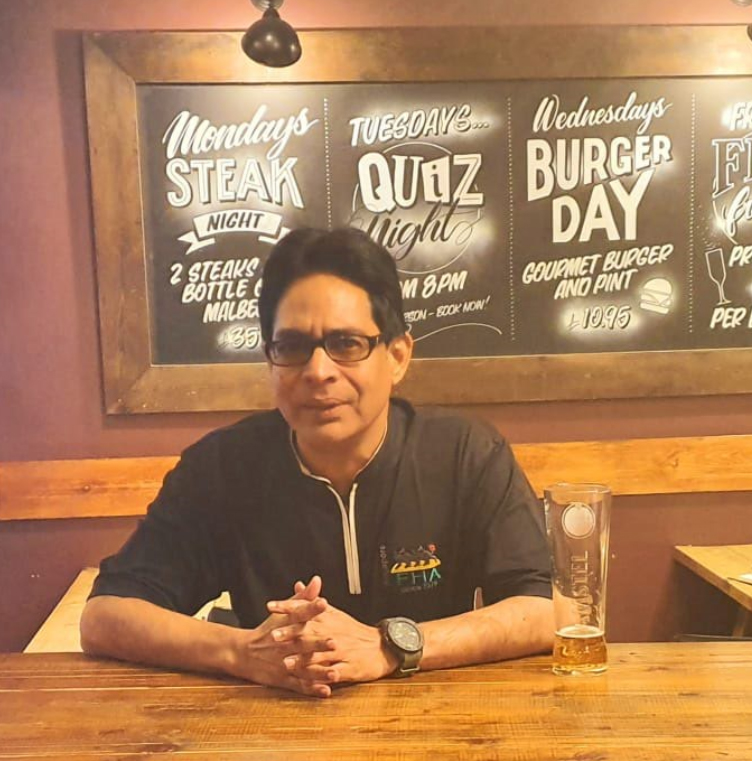
Suborno Bose, Chairman and CEO

International Institute of Hotel Management or IIHM is a hospitality and hotel management school with campuses in India at Goa, Kolkata, Bangalore, Delhi, Pune, Ahmedabad, Jaipur, Hyderabad and international campuses at Bangkok and Samarkand. International Institute of Hotel Management was founded by Dr. Suborno Bose, Chief Mentor, and CEO of IndiSmart Group & IIHM.

== Courses ==
Location of the 8 IIHM Campuses

International Institute of Hotel Management provides a bachelor's degree in Tourism from IGNOU.

== Young Chef Olympiad ==
International Institute of Hotel Management organizes YCO, or Young Chef Olympiad, a culinary Olympiad for young chefs from around the world. Over 55 nations take part in The International Young Chef Olympiad.

== IIHM University ==
International Institute of Hotel Management is about to set up India's first Tourism University in Kolkata, West Bengal, named IIHM University.

== IIHM Park Street Metro ==
The International Institute of Hotel Management (IIHM) and Kolkata Metro Railway signed a memorandum of understanding on March 2 for the co-branding of the Park Street Metro station, which will henceforth be renamed IIHM Park Street Metro.
