= Pact for the Future =

United Nations document

The Pact for the Future is a United Nations document adopted by consensus on 22 September 2024 at the Summit of the Future in New York City. Issued as General Assembly resolution A/RES/79/1, the Pact for the Future sets out a broad agenda to strengthen multilateral cooperation on sustainable development and financing for development, international peace and security, science, technology and digital cooperations, youth and future generations, and transforming of global governance.

The Pact for the Future is accompanied by two annexes: the "Global Digital Compact" and the "Declaration on Future Generations".

== Background ==
The Pact for the Future emerged from the multi-year follow-up to "Our Common Agenda", the 2021 report of the UN Secretary-General that called for renewed global solidarity and new forms of international cooperation amid challenges such as the Covid-19 pandemic, geopolitical instability, climate change and slow progress on the Sustainable Development Goals (SDGs).

Throughout 2023–2024, Member States negotiated the various elements of the Pact for the Future and its two annexes. The final texts were adopted by consensus at the Summit of the Future on 22 September 2024, with several Member States, while joining consensus, expressing reservations on specific paragraphs during the General Assembly debate.

== Purpose ==
The Pact for the Future aims to:

- revitalize multilateralism in a fragmented geopolitical environment
- accelerate implementation of the 2030 Agenda and address financing gaps, poverty eradication and climate action
- update global governance structures to reflect contemporary realities
- promote responsible and inclusive development and use of science, technology and innovation
- strengthen human rights and recommit to peaceful settlement of disputes
- safeguard the needs and interests of future generations.

== Content ==
=== Structure ===
The Pact opens with a preamble in which Heads of State and Government declare that they have gathered at UN Headquarters "to protect the needs and interests of present and future generations through the actions in this Pact for the Future". It describes the world as facing "profound global transformation", marked by rising catastrophic and existential risks and "terrible suffering", but also containing opportunities grounded in common humanity.

The Pact reaffirms commitment to the 2030 Agenda for Sustainable Development and identifies poverty eradication as "the greatest global challenge". It highlights climate change as one of the greatest challenges of our time and emphasizes the importance of respect for international law, human rights and the Charter of the United Nations.

After the preamble, the Pact sets out 56 overarching actions grouped into five areas:

- sustainable development and financing for development
- international peace and security
- science, technology and innovation and digital cooperation
- youth and future generations
- transforming global governance.

=== Sustainable development and financing for development ===
The Pact for the Future commits States to "take bold, ambitious, accelerated, just and transformative actions" to implement the 2030 Agenda and "leave no one behind" (Action 1). It places "the eradication of poverty at the centre" of efforts to achieve the SDGs (Action 2), and commits to ending hunger and eliminating food insecurity and malnutrition (Action 3).

It calls for closing the SDG financing gap (Action 4) and ensuring the multilateral trading system continues to serve sustainable development (Action 5). It includes commitments to invest in people, strengthen social cohesion (Action 6), build peaceful and inclusive societies, uphold human rights and provide access to justice for all (Action 7).

Additional actions in this area address gender equality, decent work, social protection, climate action, environmental protection and enhanced international cooperation.

=== International peace and security ===
This section commits States to redouble efforts to build and sustain peaceful, inclusive and just societies, and to prevent conflict and relapse into conflict (Action 13). It calls for addressing root causes of conflict, strengthening prevention and giving priority to peaceful dispute settlement.

Actions address:

- strengthening peace operations and special political missions
- improving peacebuilding and sustaining peace
- addressing threats to maritime security
- countering terrorism
- combating transnational organized crime and related illicit financial flows.

The Pact commits to advancing "the goal of a world free of nuclear weapons" (Action 25), upholding disarmament obligations (Action 26) and addressing the opportunities and risks associated with new and emerging technologies in the peace and security domain (Action 27).

=== Science, technology and innovation and digital cooperation ===
The Pact for the Future commits to seizing opportunities presented by science, technology and innovation "for the benefit of people and planet" (Action 28), and to supporting developing countries to strengthen their STI capacities (Action 29).

It contains commitments to:

- promote equitable access to scientific and technological advances
- strengthen international cooperation in research and innovation
- support evidence-based policymaking
- ensure technological development and use respects human rights and reduces inequalities.

States commit to supporting efforts to strengthen the United Nations' role in facilitating international cooperation on science, technology and innovation (Action 33).

=== Youth and future generations ===
The Pact for the Future commits to investing in the social and economic development of children and young people (Action 34), protecting the human rights of young people and fostering social inclusion (Action 35).

It includes commitments to strengthen meaningful youth participation at national (Action 36) and international levels (Action 37), including in UN processes.

The Pact for the Future also repeatedly underscores the needs and interests of future generations (those not yet born) and the intergenerational impact of decisions we make today.

=== Transforming global governance ===
This section calls for transforming global governance and reinvigorating multilateralism to meet current and future challenges (Action 38). It includes commitments to strengthen the role and effectiveness of the General Assembly and ECOSOC, and to enhance system-wide coherence and capacity.

A key action commits to reforming the Security Council to make it "more representative, inclusive, transparent, efficient, effective, democratic and accountable" (Action 39). Actions also address:

- strengthening the UN system (Action 45)
- ensuring effective enjoyment of human rights (Action 46)
- accelerating reform of the international financial architecture (Action 47)
- developing a framework on measures of progress "to complement and go beyond gross domestic product" (Action 53)
- strengthening international responses to complex global shocks (Action 54)
- strengthening partnerships with civil society, private sector, parliaments, and local and regional authorities (Action 55)
- strengthening international cooperation for peaceful uses of outer space (Action 56).

== Annexes ==
=== Annex I: Global Digital Compact ===
Annex I contains the Global Digital Compact. Its preamble notes that digital technologies are rapidly transforming the world and offer substantial benefits for people, societies and the planet, while digital divides and emerging risks create serious challenges—particularly for developing countries. It states that "our collective goal is an open, safe and secure digital future for all" and anchors the Compact in the Charter of the United Nations, international human rights law and the 2030 Agenda.

The Compact sets out objectives, guiding principles and actions on issues including connectivity, data governance, online safety and human rights, platform accountability, artificial intelligence and the role of the United Nations system in supporting States in building a safe, inclusive and rights-based digital environment.

=== Annex II: Declaration on Future Generations ===
Annex II contains the Declaration on Future Generations. It reaffirms that current decisions and actions have "an intergenerational multiplier effect" and emphasizes responsibility toward safeguarding the needs and interests of future generations.

The Declaration outlines principles and actions for integrating long-term and intergenerational considerations into policy and decision-making, improving the use of science, data and foresight, and equipping the multilateral system to support States in anticipatory and forward-looking governance.

== Criticism and debate ==
While adopted by consensus, several areas generated debate:

- The Russian Federation supported adoption but criticized several paragraphs it viewed as politically imbalanced or inconsistent with its national positions, particularly relating to technology and security.
- Some governments expressed concern about potential implications of digital cooperation commitments for national regulatory sovereignty.
- Civil society groups broadly welcomed the Pact but called for stronger accountability mechanisms, more ambitious climate action and more inclusive participation of marginalized groups and youth.

Commentators described the Pact as ambitious but politically complex, reflecting significant negotiated compromise among 193 Member States.

== See also ==
- United Nations Common Agenda
- Global Digital Compact
- Sustainable Development Goals
- United Nations reform
