= Fina Bank Group =

- Company type: Private
- Industry: Banking
- Founded: 1986
- Defunct: 2013
- Successor: Guaranty Trust Bank
- Headquarters: Nairobi, Kenya
- Key people: Dhanu Hansraj Chandaria (Group Chairman), Tim Marshall (Chief Group Operating Officer)
- Products: Banking, Mortgages Investments
- Website: www.finabank.com

Fina Bank Group, was a financial services organization in East Africa located in Nairobi, Kenya, with subsidiaries in Kenya, Rwanda and Uganda. It was acquired by Guaranty Trust Bank in 2013 and renamed soon after.

Before its takeover, Fina Bank Group was a medium-sized financial services provider in East Africa, focusing on meeting the banking needs of SME businesses.

As of September 2010, the total group assets were estimated at US$241 million, with shareholders' equity valued at approximately US$23.8 million. At that time, the Group operated 25 bank branches in the region (13 in Kenya, 6 in Rwanda and 6 in Uganda). In July 2013, the Group's total assets were valued at US$338, with shareholders' equity in excess of US$140 million. At that time, the Group operated 38 bank branches across East Africa; 17 in Rwanda, 14 in Kenya and 7 in Uganda.

== History ==
The institution began operations as a non-banking financial company, in 1986. In 1991 it was acquired by private investors, who converted it into a commercial bank, in 1995, following the acquisition of a banking license from the Central Bank of Kenya, the country's banking regulator. The bank opened its doors as a fully fledged commercial bank in 1996.

In 2004, Fina Bank acquired BACAR, a privately owned bank, that had been seized due to managerial reasons, by the National Bank of Rwanda, Rwanda's banking regulator. In 2005, the bank changed its business strategy and re-launched Fina Bank as a banking institution that focuses on serving small and medium-sized enterprises (SMEs). Between 2005 and 2008, the bank re-organized its operations in Rwanda and continued branch expansion in Kenya.

In 2008, Fina Bank re-organized its operations in Rwanda and opened up business in Uganda with two brand new Branches.

In July 2013, the Nigerian lender Guaranty Trust Bank, acquired 70% shareholding in Fina Bank Group for a cash infusion of US$100 million. In January 2014, the member companies of Fina Bank Group rebranded as subsidiaries of Guaranty Trust Bank.

== See also ==
- Guaranty Trust Bank (Kenya)
- Guaranty Trust Bank (Rwanda)
- Guaranty Trust Bank (Uganda)
- Economy of Kenya
