= Temiloluwa Prioleau =

Nigerian computer scientist

- Citizenship: Nigeria
- Education: University of Texas at Austin; Georgia Institute of Technology
- Known for: Application of data science to healthcare and human sensing
- Scientific career
- Fields: mHealth; Data Science; Computer Science
- Workplaces: Rice University, Dartmouth College, Emory University
- Website: https://www.t-prioleau.com/

Temiloluwa O. Prioleau is a Nigerian computer scientist, assistant professor of computer science at Emory University. In January 2019, she became the first black woman tenure-track faculty member in computer science at an Ivy League university when she joined Dartmouth College as an assistant professor.

== Early life and education ==
Prioleau's father was an electrical engineer. She grew up in Lagos, Nigeria, attending a local primary school and later boarding school in Nigeria. She moved to the United States when she was in 11th grade, finishing high school in Texas. She gained a Bachelor of Science in Electrical Engineering from the University of Texas at Austin in 2010 before completing a Masters and then PhD at Georgia Institute of Technology in 2016. Prioleau was a postdoctoral fellow at Rice University, after which she became an assistant professor of computer science at Dartmouth College, starting in January 2019.

== Career ==
Prioleau founded and co-directed the Augmented Health Lab at Dartmouth College, and is a faculty affiliate of The Center for Technology and Behavioral Health (CTBH). She left Dartmouth to join Emory University in July 2025. Her research work is on the application of data science to human sensing and healthcare. Prioleau has been recognized for her research on harnessing data from wearable medical devices to understand and improve diabetes.

== See also ==
- Nonye Soludo
- Rita Orji
- Ire Aderinokun
