= Confidence Staveley =

Nigerian cybersecurity person

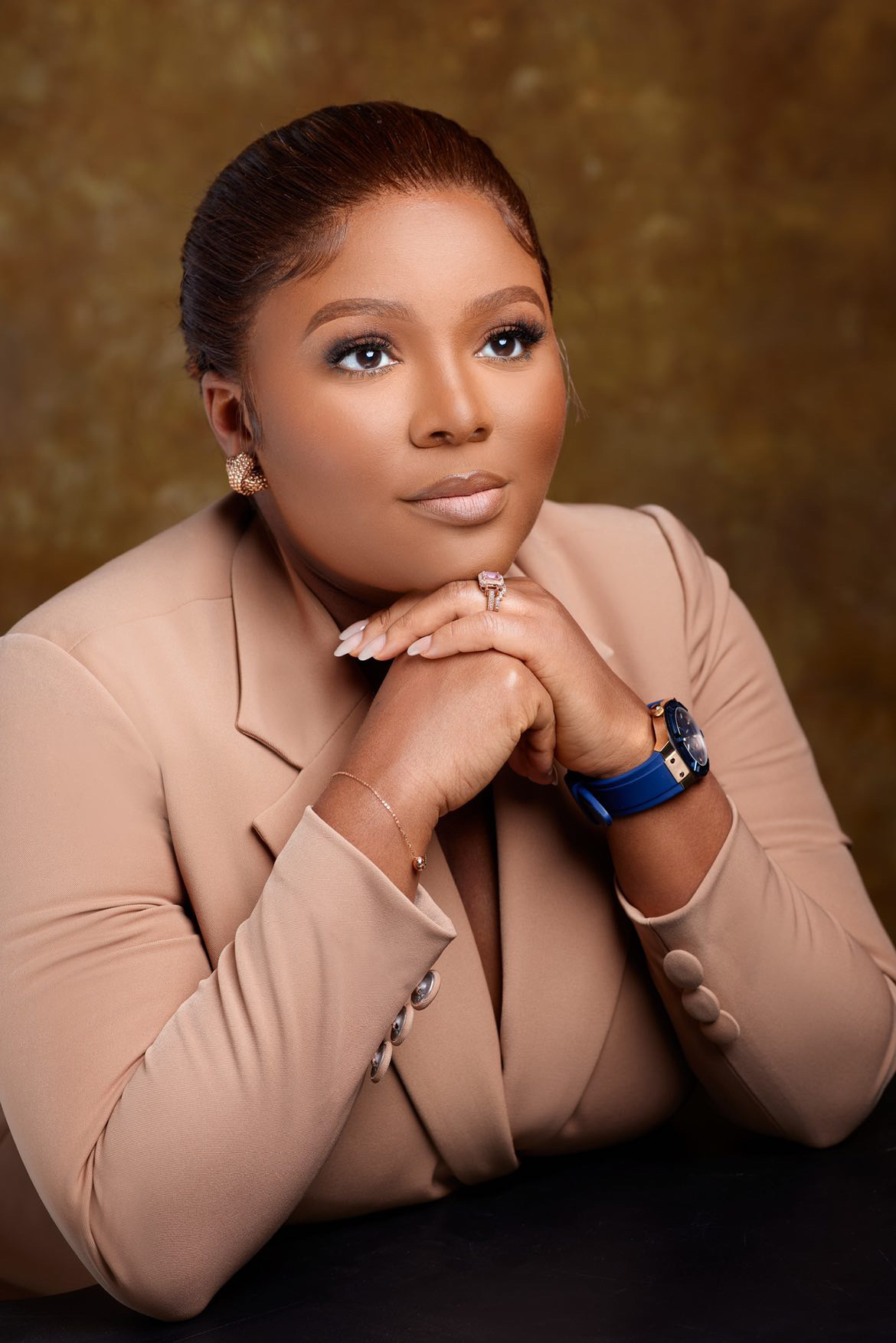
- Confidence Staveley's photo
- Citizenship: Nigeria
- Education: Middlesex University (BSc), University of Bradford (MSc)
- Alma mater: Middlesex University, University of Bradford
- Occupations: Executive Director, Techpreneur
- Years active: 2011 to present
- Employer(s): Cross River State, Lloyds Banking Group, Calabar International Convention Centre
- Organization: Cybersafe Foundation
- Known for: Digital inclusion
- Notable work: Cybersafe Foundation
- Awards: Women in Tech Africa Awards (2024); ISC2 Global Achievement Awards (2023); Cyber Security Women Supporter of the Year Award (2022); Meridian Global Citizen Award (2022); Cyber security woman of the year (2021)
- Website: confidencestaveley.com

Confidence Staveley is a Nigerian cybersecurity and information technology professional She is also the founder and Executive director of Cybersafe foundation; a non-profit that promote cyber security awareness and education within most vulnerable communities in Africa. And the Founder of MerkleFence; an application‑security consultancy.

== Education background ==
Staveley has a Bachelor of Science in Information Technology and Business Information Systems from Middlesex University, London. She furthered her education with a Master’s degree in Information Technology Management from the University of Bradford. An elective on cryptology during her master's crystallized her passion for cybersecurity.

== Career ==
Early in her career in 2011, Staveley served as an IT Officer and Executive Assistant within the Cross River State Government, where she supported public‑sector IT operations. She then transitioned into banking, joining Lloyds Banking Group as a Customer Service Advisor and Telephone Banking Consultant. In 2013, she took on the role of IT Specialist at the Calabar International Convention Centre. By 2015, she had moved to InfoGraphics Nigeria, where she oversaw technical marketing and interactive media. From 2016 to 2019, she served as a Cybersecurity Analyst for UIC Innovations Africa. By December 2019, she was appointed Country Manager for DIGISS, a computer security firm. At the same time through to 2022 she also co-led Gidinerd, working part-time as Managing Partner of this marketing agency.

=== Cybersafe Foundation ===
In 2019, Staveley founded Cybersafe foundation, a non-governmental organization focused on bridging the digital divide by equipping underserved communities in Africa with cybersecurity and AI skills. The organization delivers practical training and awareness initiatives aimed at improving digital safety and economic inclusion. Which includes the CyberGirls Fellowship, a training and mentorship program for young African women.

In 2021 her organisation partnered with the Central bank of Nigeria to deliver emergency cybersecurity interventions which led to the Africa’s first storified cybersecurity handbook and an Afrobeat cybersecurity awareness song #NoGoFallMaga. In 2022, Cybersafe foundation in partnership with the UK Government launched the Digital Access Program to bridge the digital skills gender gap in Nigeria.

== Awards and recognition ==
In 2024 staveley was listed among the Top 40 Global Thought Leaders in Security and Safety, and named as one of “150 Fascinating Females Fighting Cybercrime” by Women Know Cyber. In 2022, she ranked among Nigeria’s Top 100 Most Inspiring Women. In 2023 she made the list of ABCD Africa’s 50 Most Impactful Voices. She was also the first Nigerian woman inducted into the Forbes Technology Council. Her leadership has also been recognized internationally honored as a 2021 African Obama Leader, and earned the IFSEC Global “One-to-Watch” accolade in Security & Fire.

=== Awards ===
- Women in Tech Africa Awards — 2024
- ISC2 Global Achievement Award —2023
- Cyber Security Experts Association of Nigeria Merit Awards — 2022.
- Cyber Security Women Supporter of the Year Award — 2022.
- Meridian Global Citizen Award — 2022.
- Cyber security woman of the year — 2021.
- U.S. State Department International Visitor Leadership Program (IVLP) Impact Award — 2021.

== See also ==
- Abisiga Mojeed Damilola
- Kennedy Ekezie
- Florence Seriki
