= Nigerian Humanitarian Awards and Magazine =

Nigerian annual award ceremony

- Current: Nigerian Humanitarian Awards and Magazine 2026
- Awarded for: Contributions to humanitarian service and positive social impact
- Country: Nigeria
- Presented by: Emmanuel Anabueze
- First award: 2022
- Website: thehumanitarianawards.ng

The Nigerian Humanitarian Awards and Magazine is an annual awards program established in 2022, to recognize individuals and organizations for their contributions to humanitarian service, community development, and social impact. It was founded by Emmanuel Anabueze.

Some notable recipients of this award include Governor of Niger State, Mohammed Bago, Kanu Nwankwo, Zulaihat Dikko Radda, First Lady of Katsina State, Hajiya Huriyya Dauda Lawal, First Lady of Zamfara State, Nafisa Nasir Idris, First Lady of Kebbi State, Umar Buba Bindir and Fatima Akilu

== Nomination process ==
Nominations are announced a few weeks before the event, with public online voting determining the final awardees. The nominees include individuals, NGOs, and corporate entities that have made significant contributions to areas such as healthcare, education, empowerment, environmental sustainability, and crisis response. Leading up to the ceremony, various programs, humanitarian activities, and empowerment initiatives are being conducted to mark World Humanitarian Day.

== Award Categories ==
- Humanitarian Legislative Member of The Year Male/Female
- Humanitarian Public Office Holder Of The Year Male/Female
- Young Humanitarian of the Year (Under 40) Male/Female
- Humanitarian Organization of the Year
- Humanitarian Community Impact Award
- Humanitarian International Organization Of The Year
- Humanitarian Healthcare Organization Of The Year
- Humanitarian Organization On Educational Support
- Humanitarian Organization On Empowerment
- Humanitarian Organization On Environmental Support
- Humanitarian Organization on Crisis Response and Resilience Award
- Humanitarian Organization On Women/Widow Empowerment
- Humanitarian Organization On Child Welfare & Support
- Humanitarian Sustainable Investment Leader Award
- Humanitarian Sports Personality Of The Year
- Humanitarian Organization On Community Development
- Humanitarian Organization On Refugee Support and Integration
- Humanitarian Organization For Food Security and Nutrition
- Humanitarian Organization For Shelter and Housing
- Humanitarian Organization On Clean Water & Hygiene
- Humanitarian Entertainment Personality
- Humanitarian Governor of the Year
- Humanitarian First Lady of the Year
- Humanitarian Commissioner of the Year
- Humanitarian Human Right Activist
- Humanitarian Television/Radio Program
- Youth Ambassador of the Year
- innovation in humanitarianism

== Ceremonies ==
=== First edition (2022) ===
The maiden edition held in 2022

=== Second edition (2023) ===
The 2023 edition was held in Abuja and had the presence of Governor Mohammed Bago of Niger State who got an award for Supportive Humanitarian Governor Of The Year, Fatima Akilu (Neem Foundation) got awarded as Outstanding Humanitarian on Community Support and Empowerment, Engr. Sagir Ibrahim Koki, Vice Chairman, House Committee on Petroleum Resources (Midstream) who got an award for Outstanding Humanitarian on Community Support Empowerment and also Dr Gideon Osi, Chairman/CEO of Gosima Group and founder of Gideon and Joy life and leadership Foundation was awarded Humanitarian of the Year.

=== Third edition (2024) ===
The 2024 edition was held at Merit House, Maitama in August, 2024. Some notable individuals that were honoured at the event are these three first ladies Dr. Zulaihat Dikko Radda of Katsina State, Hajiya Huriyya Dauda Lawal of Zamfara State, and Dr. Nafisa Nasir Idris of Kebbi State. The 2024 edition also had the presence of the Nigerian Minister of Art and Culture, Hannatu Musawa amongst others.

== Winners ==
=== 2023 Winners ===
Below is the list of winners in 2023 edition.

Recipient	Award
Mohammed Umar Bago	Supportive Humanitarian Governor of the Year
Sagir Ibrahim Koki	Outstanding Humanitarian on Community Support and Empowerment
Peter Akpanke	Humanitarian Award on Rural Empowerment and Sustainable Resources
Gideon Osi	Humanitarian of the Year Award
Fatima Akilu	Outstanding Humanitarian on Community Support and Empowerment
Fatima Mamman Daura	Outstanding Humanitarian Initiative for IDP Empowerment and Support Award
Tukur Mohammed Lawal	Humanitarian Exceptional Leader in Community Support and Empowerment
Munira Suleiman Tanimu	Outstanding Humanitarian for Community Support and Less Privileged Empowerment Award
Muhammad Mustapha	Outstanding Humanitarian Foundation for Clean Water Provision and Community Health Enhancement
Jude Chidera Eze	Humanitarian Award for Empowerment and Development Excellence of the Year
Benjamin Olowojebutu	Outstanding Humanitarian Foundation for Disease Eradication and Healthcare Transformation Award
Noyinmot Olasunkanmi Busari	Humanitarian Award for Providing Health and Vision Care
Umar B. Bindir	Outstanding Humanitarian on Community Support and Empowerment in Education
Chibuike Echem	Champion of Youth Leadership Impact Award
Secure the Future International Initiative	Humanitarian NGO for Counselling and Psychotherapy Support
Sparkle Foundation	Best Humanitarian Supportive NGO on Education
Jennifer Ephraim Foundation	Education Equality Advocate Award of the Year
Alkaita Legacy Foundation	Posthumous Humanitarian Lifetime Achievement Award
Bello Halliru Khalid	Best Humanitarian Agency for Education Empowerment and Support
Omekaodinma Emmanuel Ikechukwu	Humanitarian Young Entrepreneur of the Year
Mark Aniogor Ifeakachukwu	Outstanding Humanitarian Volunteer of the Year
Abuja Continental Hotel	Corporate Social Responsibility Organization of the Year

=== 2024 Winners ===
Below are the list of 2024 winners.

Recipient	Award
Hajiya Huriyya Dauda Lawal, First Lady of Zamfara State	Humanitarian First Lady of the Year on Women Empowerment Award
Hajiya Zulaihat Dikko Radda, First Lady of Katsina State	Humanitarian First Lady of the Year on Education and Child Support Award
Dr. Hajiya Nafisa Nasir Idris	Humanitarian First Lady of the Year on Community Development Award
Hon. Sulaiman Abubakar Gumi	Humanitarian Legislative Member of the Year Award
Mr. Godwin Chukwuebuka C.	Young Humanitarian of the Year Award
Majesty Kelechi Olugu	Humanitarian Award for Community Impact and Development
Mrs. Chinyere Chukwudi Zimako	Outstanding Humanitarian for Contribution to Women’s Entrepreneurship Award
JohnBosco Onunkwo	Humanitarian Award on Empowerment and Community Development
Abraham Otti	Humanitarian Award on Empowerment and Community Development
Chukwujekwu N. Francis	Humanitarian Award for Community Development
Mrs. Khadijah Musa Sakaba	Humanitarian Award for Excellence in Women and Youth Development
Mr. Musa Saint	Community Health Activist of the Year Award
Dr. Firdausi Ringim	Humanitarian Award on Sustainable Development
Oluebube Charity Foundation	Outstanding Humanitarian Foundation on Child Welfare and Sustainable Development
Miss Serena Amarachukwu Joseph	Humanitarian Female Volunteer of the Year Award
Miss Oluwafunmike Esther Salami	Outstanding Humanitarian on Contribution to Education and Community Development Award
Mr. Mark Ifeakachukwu Aniogor	Young Humanitarian Award on Community Development
Mr. Abiodun Emmanuel Aina	Humanitarian Award for Outstanding Contributions to Climate Resilience and Environmental Stewardship
Frederick Oscar	Digital Inclusion Humanitarian Award
Mr. Precious Dorti	Outstanding Young Humanitarian on Community Impact and Development Award

=== 2025 Winners ===
Below are the list of winners at the 2025 Nigerian Humanitarian Awards.

Recipient	Award
Amb. Gift Emmanuel	Humanitarian Philanthropist of the Year
Dr. (Amb.) Onyebuchi Chris Ifediora	Global Humanitarian Youth Impact Leader of the Year 2025
Dr. Darlington Nwabumike	Humanitarian Personality of the Year
Amb. Abduljabbar Surajo Guga	Humanitarian Leadership & Community Impact Award
Alhaji Suleiman Muhammad Radda	Humanitarian Business Leader for Social Impact Award
Christopher Imumolen (P.C.I.)	Humanitarian Education & Social Impact Champion of the Year
Kenneth Nwokike (Jnr)	Visionary Leader in Financial Innovation and Humanitarian Impact
Ifeoluwa Onifade	Pioneer in Aviation Education and Humanitarian Access
Nonye Soludo	First Lady of the Year (Health Care & Child Support)
Hajiya Lami Ahmadu Fintiri	First Lady of the Year (Health Care & Grassroots Empowerment)
Chief Jude Okpelibie	Humanitarian Entrepreneur of the Year
Omekaodinma Emmanuel Ikechukwu	Humanitarian Young Entrepreneur of the Year
Hon. Hamza Sule Faskari	Community Service Excellence Award
Prophetess Joy Chinyere	Humanitarian Faith Leader of the Year
De Imperial Philanthropic Family	Humanitarian Philanthropic Organization of the Year
Adewale Barakat	Women's Health Advocacy Organization of the Year
