= Fola Adeola =

Nigerian businessman and investor

Tajudeen Afolabi Adeola
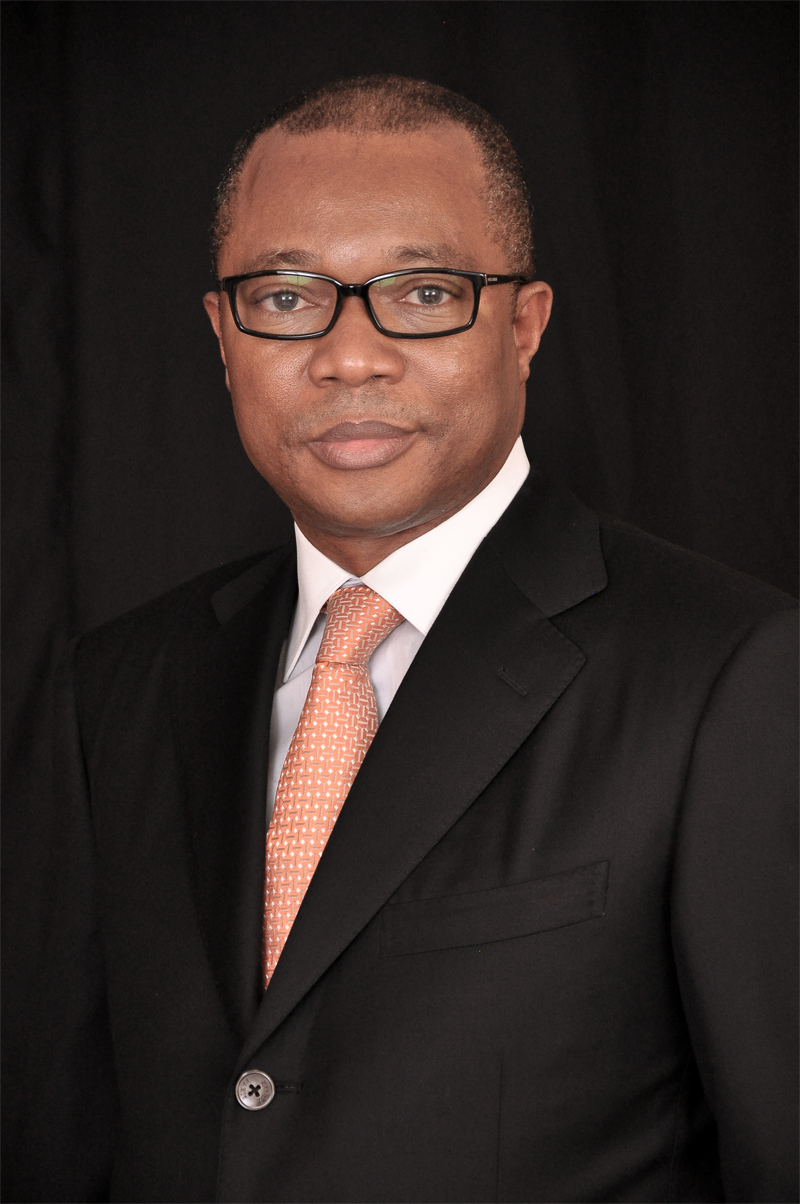
- Born: 10 January 1954 (age 72); Nigeria
- Education: Methodist Boy's High School, Lagos. Yaba College of Technology

Tajudeen Afolabi Adeola is a Nigerian businessman. He is a co-founder of Guaranty Trust Bank (GTBank Plc, a member of the Commission for Africa, as well as founder and chairman of the FATE Foundation.

== Education ==
Adeola completed his secondary school education at Methodist Boys High School, Lagos. He obtained a Diploma in Accounting from Yaba College of Technology in 1975 and became a Chartered Accountant in 1980 following his training with Deloitte, Haskins and Sells and D.O. Dafinone & Company (both Chartered Accountants). Over the years he has received professional development training at Harvard Business School, INSEAD, and the International Institute for Management Development in Switzerland.

In 1999, he completed a one-year sabbatical at the National Institute for Policy and Strategic Studies in Kuru, Jos, Nigeria,

== Private sector ==
In 1990, he (together with Tayo Aderinokun) established Guaranty Trust Bank, which he served as Managing Director and Chief Executive Officer from 1990 to July 2002. The bank has since expanded beyond Nigeria to other neighbouring African countries (The Gambia, Sierra Leone, Ghana and Liberia) and in United Kingdom. The bank became listed on the Nigerian Stock Exchange in 1996.

In 2002, Adeola retired from Guaranty Trust Bank, after twelve years, handing over to his deputy, Tayo Aderinokun. Since then, he has served as the chairman UTC, ARM, Lotus Capital, Eterna Oil, CardinalStone Partners Limited, Tafsan Breweries (board member), and Credit Registry Services.

He is also the chairman of Main One Cable Company Limited which completed the construction of an open access submarine cable system that spanned 14,000 kilometres and provides international and internet connectivity to countries on the Atlantic Coast from Portugal to Lagos in 2010.

Through his investment firm, Iwosan Investments, Adeola aims to solidify its presence in Nigeria’s healthcare landscape. The acquisition of Paelon Memorial Hospital not only reinforces Iwosan’s commitment to delivering reliable, modern, and patient-centered services but also aligns with its vision of creating a comprehensive network of healthcare facilities across the country.

== Public sector ==
Adeola served as Chairman of the National Pension Commission, following the promulgation into law of the Pension Bill (principally authored by him), by the National Assembly of Nigeria. He chaired the Lagos State Disaster Relief Committee which was set up following the 27 January 2002 Lagos armoury explosion. He was the Vice-Presidential candidate of the Action Congress of Nigeria (ACN) serving as running mate to former Economic and Financial Crimes Commission (EFCC) chairman, Nuhu Ribadu in the 2011 presidential elections.

Adeola was also a member of the National Honours and Awards Committee and was appointed a member of the Governing Council of Lagos State University in November 2004. He served as a member of the Solid Minerals Committee (constituted by the Federal Government) and was the Chairman of Ogun State Development Trust Fund Committee. He was a council member of Lagos State University and until 17 January 2011 served as a council member Olabisi Onabanjo University.

== Civic work ==
Adeola established the FATE Foundation in 2000. FATE is a non-governmental organisation which aims to encourage entrepreneurship, using a mix of training, mentoring, loan support and consulting to support young Nigerians.

FATE opened an innovation centre in Abeokuta, the Institute for Venture Design, in collaboration with the Centre for Design Research at Stanford University, which runs an entrepreneurship program focused on engineering, technology, and innovation, and which aims to promote development of industry in Nigeria.

Adeola served as a member of the Global Advisory Committee on Philanthropy of the World Economic Forum for four years. In 2001, he was invited to join twenty-four other business leaders for the Aspen Institute ISIB Annual Business Leaders Dialogue in Aspen, Colorado. In May 2004, he was appointed Commissioner on the Commission for Africa by the British Prime Minister Tony Blair.

He was a Council member and is Fellow of the Institute of Chartered Accountants of Nigeria and is also Fellow of the Institute of Directors of Nigeria.

== Honours and awards ==
He was nationally decorated as Officer of the Order of the Federal Republic (OFR) in December 2002 by President Olusegun Obasanjo. He has an honorary doctorate from Nkumba University, Ntebbe, Uganda. Banker of the Decade in 2009 by the Vanguard Newspaper group. Distinguished Famous Alumni award by Yaba Tech. Zik Leadership in 2003. This Day Awards 2011 – Change Makers in Social Entrepreneurship.

== Personal life ==
Adeola is married to Hajara and has six children.
