= Florence Seriki =

Nigerian entrepreneur

- Born: 16 August 1963
- Died: 3 March 2017 (aged 53); Lagos University Teaching Hospital, Lagos
- Citizenship: Nigeria
- Education: Obafemi Awolowo University
- Occupation: Engineer
- Years active: 2003-2017
- Notable work: Omatek Computers
- Awards: Best IT Woman of the Year 2003

Florence Seriki MFR (16 August 1963 – 3 March 2017) was the founder and CEO of Omatek Ventures Plc., the first Nigerian ICT company in Africa to assemble and manufacture computers and computer parts like computer cases, speakers, keyboards, mouse.

== Early life and education ==
Seriki was born in Lagos, Nigeria, but is originally from Delta State. She had her secondary education at the Reagan Memorial Baptist Secondary School, Sabo, Yaba between 1975 and 1980 and then proceeded to the Federal School of Science, Lagos for her A levels. She graduated with a Bachelors of Science degree from the University of Ife (now Obafemi Awolowo University, Ile-Ife).

== Omatek ==
In 1993, during the CTO exhibition (organized by the commercial section of the American Embassy in Nigeria), Seriki launched Omatek brand of Computers which was actually the first attempt of its kind in Nigeria. In 2003, she became the first African to produce Nigerian made computer cases, speakers, keyboards and computer mouse from completely knocked down (CKD) as the factory produced made in Nigeria Omatek computers, notebooks and servers with all its components made in Nigeria.

== Awards and recognition ==
Awards won include:

- Most Fascinating Nigerian (MFN)-Press Merit services
- Most Outstanding/Innovative company of the decade – Africa Digital Awards 2010
- Computer Hardware of the Year 2010 –National Information technology Merit Awards
- Best Computer Company of the Year 2010 – West Africa ICT Development Awards
- Professional Fellowship Award-Nigerian Computers Society
- Female Entrepreneur of the Year 2009-Equisite Magazine/Eloy '09 Awards.
- Life Time Achievement Award for revolutionizing IT in Nigeria-3rd Lagos Enterprise Award 2009
- Distinguished Alumni Award-Obafemi Awolowo University Alumni Association(Lagos Branch)
- Legend of Technology 2009 – Titans of Technology
- Nigerian American Chamber of Commerce Young Entrepreneurship Award
- Outstanding Female Entrepreneur of the year, 2003
- Dr. Kwame Nkrumah Excellence in Enterprise Award, 2005
- Best IT Woman of the Year 2003
- Distinguished O.A.U Alumni Award for outstanding Achievement in IT
- Digital Peers International Award of Excellence, in recognition of immense contributions to ICT, 2005.
- African leader par excellence Award 2008 by the international institute of comparative leadership for Africans and blacks in diaspora and the Accolade communication.

== Personal life ==
She was married with three children, a boy and two girls.

== Death ==
Seriki died at the Lagos University Teaching Hospital (LUTH) on Friday 3 March 2017 from cancer of the pancreas.

== See also ==
- Confidence Staveley
- Rita Orji
- Ire Aderinokun
