= Anna Korhonen =

Finnish computer scientist

Anna-Leena Korhonen is a Finnish computer scientist and linguist who works in England as professor of natural language processing at the University of Cambridge, where she is co-director of the Language Technology Lab and the Institute for Technology and Humanity, fellow of the Alan Turing Institute, director of the Centre for Human Inspired Artificial Intelligence, fellow of the European Laboratory for Learning and Intelligent Systems, and a senior research fellow of Churchill College, Cambridge. Her research interests include natural language processing, the applications of natural language processing in health, and the social consequences of AI-based language tools. She is panel member of the UN Independent International Scientific Panel on AI.

== Education and career ==
Korhonen studied linguistics as an undergraduate at the University of Helsinki. After a master's degree in linguistics at the University of Reading, she completed a Ph.D. in computer science at the University of Cambridge. Her 2002 doctoral dissertation, Subcategorization acquisition, was supervised by Ted Briscoe.

After postdoctoral research at the University of Pennsylvania and at the National Institute of Informatics in Japan, she returned to Cambridge in 2005 as a senior research associate and Royal Society University Research Fellow. She became a reader in computational linguistics in 2014, professor of natural language processing in 2017, director of the Centre for Human Inspired Artificial Intelligence in 2022, and co-director of the Institute for Technology and Humanity in 2024.

== Recognition ==
Korhonen was named as a Fellow of the Association for Computational Linguistics in 2023, "for significant contributions to lexical acquisition, multilingual and low resource NLP, socially beneficial language applications, and services to the ACL community". She was elected to the Academia Europaea in 2025, and to the British Academy in 2026.
