= Guaranty Trust Bank (Uganda) =

Tier II financial institution in Uganda

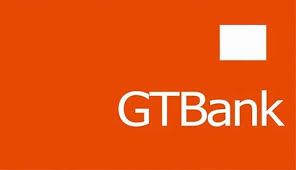
- Type: Subsidiary of Guaranty Trust Holding Company
- Industry: Financial services
- Founded: 2008
- Headquarters: Plot 56 Kira Road, Kampala, Uganda
- Key people: Jaqueline Busingye; Chairperson; Oluwole Shodiyan; MD/CEO
- Products: Loans, savings, investments, debit cards, credit cards
- Revenue: ▲Aftertax: UGX1 billion (US$259,000) (2019)
- Total assets: UGX:225 billion (approx. US$58.22million) (2019)
- Parent: Guaranty Trust Bank
- Website: gtbank.co.ug/home/

Guaranty Trust Bank (Uganda), commonly referred to as GT Bank Uganda, is a Tier II credit services company in Uganda. It was previously licensed as commercial bank by Bank of Uganda, the central bank and the national banking regulator of that country. The Bank of Uganda gave GTBank Uganda from 1 April 2024 until 30 June 2024 to transition from a Tier I commercial bank to a Tier II credit company, due to capitalization issues.

== Overview ==
As of December 2019, GT Bank Uganda had assets valued at UGX:225 billion (approx. US$58.22 million) with shareholders equity of UGX:38 billion (approx. US$9.83 million). That calendar year, the institution made UGX:2 billion (approx. $518,000) in pre-tax profit and UGX:1 billion (approx. $259,000) in after-tax profit, the first time the institution was profitable in the previous 12 years. GT Bank Uganda is a subsidiary of Guaranty Trust Bank (GTB), a Nigerian financial services conglomerate headquartered in Nigeria, with subsidiaries in several West, Central and East African countries.

== History ==
GT Bank (Uganda) was founded in 2008 as Fina Bank (Uganda), a subsidiary of the Fina Bank Group based in Kenya. In 2013, the Group sold 70 percent shareholding to GTB for a cash consideration of US$100 million. In January 2014, the bank rebranded to its current name to reflect its current shareholding.

GT bank was established in 2008 as Fina Bank Uganda, a unit of the Kenya based Fina Bank Group.

== Reclassification to Tier II class ==
In Q2 2022, the Ugandan Minister of Finance, in consultation with the Bank of Uganda, signed new regulations raising minimum capital levels for commercial banks from UGX:25 billion (approx. US$6.7 million) to UGX:150 billion (approx. US$40 million) by 30 June 2024. Due to its inability to raise the minimum capital requirements as stipulated, GTBank Uganda was authorized to downgrade to a Tier II credit financial institution, whose minimum capital requirements of UGX:25 billion (approx. US$6.8 million) it met, at that time.

== Branch Network ==
As of April 2024, GT Bank Uganda has a network of branches at the following locations:

- Main Branch: 56 Kira Road, Kamwookya, Kampala
- Buganda Road Branch: 7 Buganda Road, Kampala
- Nakivubo Road Branch: 34-38 Nakivubo Road, Kampala
- Industrial Area Branch: 13 Mulwana Road, Kampala
- Mbarara Branch: 52-54 High Street, Mbarara
- Kyaliwajjala Branch: 31 Namugongo Road, Kyaliwajjala, Kira Town
- Colville Street Branch: 5-6 Colville Street, Kampala
- Makerere Branch: Makerere.

== See also ==
- List of banks in Uganda
- Banking in Uganda
- Guaranty Trust Bank (Kenya)
- Guaranty Trust Bank (Rwanda)
