= Young Chef Olympiad =

International culinary competition for student chefs

- Status: Active
- Genre: Culinary competition
- Frequency: Annual
- Location: India
- Country: India
- Inaugurated: 2015
- Founder: Suborno Bose
- Organiser: International Institute of Hotel Management
- Website: ycolympiad.com

The Young Chef Olympiad (YCO) is an annual international culinary competition for student chefs, organised by the International Institute of Hotel Management (IIHM). Founded by Suborno Bose, it was first held in 2015. The competition has been held in several Indian cities, with final rounds normally held in Kolkata.

== Format ==
The Olympiad is contested by students representing participating countries and culinary institutions. Its format has varied by edition, generally comprising preliminary rounds in multiple Indian cities followed by a final in Kolkata. The 2021 and 2022 editions were conducted virtually because of the COVID-19 pandemic.

== Editions ==
Young Chef Olympiad editions
Edition	Dates	Format and locations	Reported participation	Gold	Silver	Bronze
1st	2015	Kolkata	15 countries	Ashwin; Malaysia	Marcin; Spain	Tajinder; United Kingdom
2nd	27 January–2 February 2016	Delhi, Mumbai, Bengaluru and Kolkata	Over 50 countries	Daniella Garmond; Canada	Gabriela Aleksandrova Hristova; United Arab Emirates	Johan Kurkela (Finland) and Fernando Andres Guajardo Moguel (Mexico), joint
3rd	28 January–2 February 2017	Delhi, Pune, Bengaluru and Kolkata	Over 45 countries	Tham Jiajun Mathew; Singapore	Andrew Ou Kai Peng; Malaysia	Selah Schmoll; Canada
4th	28 January–2 February 2018	Delhi, Pune, Bengaluru and Kolkata	Over 50 countries	Lai Jia Yi; Malaysia	Surya Sekhar Roy Choudhury; India	—
5th	28 January–2 February 2019	Delhi, Pune, Bengaluru and Kolkata	50 countries	Cyrène Randrianasolo; France	Bogdan-Petru-Alin Vandici; Romania	Luke Hayward; England
6th	28 January–2 February 2020	Delhi, Pune, Goa, Bengaluru and Kolkata	55 countries	Chen Khai Loong; Malaysia	Austin Cale Labago; Philippines	Bethany Collins; England
7th	31 January–6 February 2021	Virtual	50 countries	Lee Maan Ki; Hong Kong	Srijaenthi Natraj; United Arab Emirates	Jessica Louise Hoskins; New Zealand
8th	2022	Virtual	46 countries	Matteo Cignetti; Italy	Chong Jia De; Singapore	Halldor Haflidason; Iceland
9th	29 January–4 February 2023	Delhi, Hyderabad, Goa, Bengaluru, Pune and Kolkata	More than 50 countries	Emil Zeynalzade; Azerbaijan	Patiphon Lertsuakitti; Thailand	Naureen Shaikh; India
10th	29 January–4 February 2024	Delhi, Pune, Bengaluru, Hyderabad, Goa and Kolkata	60 countries	Leyla Valiyeva; Azerbaijan	Clifford Jeff Cadunggo Unabia (Philippines) and Kamal Thapa (Nepal), joint	Francesco Orsi; Italy
11th	2–8 February 2025	Goa, Delhi, Pune, Hyderabad, Bengaluru and Kolkata	50 countries	Kamran Taylor; England	Arsen Armenakyan; Armenia	Yves Gabriel Cabrera Po; Philippines
12th	1–6 February 2026	Bengaluru, Delhi, Pune, Hyderabad, Goa and Kolkata	40 countries	Enri Cuedari; Albania	Dominic Thomas Grundy; England	Vidanagamage Rumira Reshan Piyasiri; Sri Lanka

== History ==
The first Young Chef Olympiad was held in Kolkata in 2015, with participants from 15 countries. The following editions expanded the competition to preliminary rounds in several Indian cities before a final round in Kolkata.

The 2018 edition took place in Delhi, Pune, Bengaluru and Kolkata. The 2019 edition was held in Delhi, Pune, Bengaluru and Kolkata from 28 January to 2 February, with participants from 50 countries.

The 2020 event used venues in Delhi, Pune, Goa, Bengaluru and Kolkata and involved participants from 55 countries. The 2021 and 2022 editions were conducted virtually because of the COVID-19 pandemic.

The competition returned to an in-person format in 2023. That edition was held in Delhi, Hyderabad, Goa, Bengaluru, Pune and Kolkata. The 2024 edition included 60 participants from different countries.

== Results ==
The early-edition results were reported in contemporary coverage. Cyrène Randrianasolo won the 2019 competition and Chen Khai Loong won in 2020.

Matteo Cignetti won the 2022 edition, while Emil Zeynalzade won in 2023 and Leyla Valiyeva won in 2024.

Kamran Taylor won the 2025 edition. Enri Cuedari won the 2026 edition; its final was held in Kolkata.
