= Tayo Aderinokun =

Nigerian entrepreneur

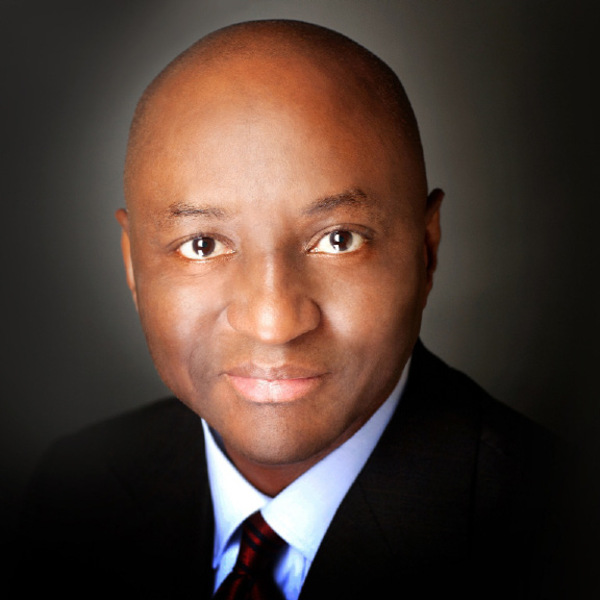
- Portrait of Tayo Aderinokun
- Born: May 8, 1955; Kano, Kano State, Nigeria
- Died: 14 June 2011 (aged 56); United Kingdom
- Education: University of Lagos; University of California, Los Angeles
- Occupations: Banker, entrepreneur
- Known for: Co-Founder of Guaranty Trust Bank
- Spouses: Funlola Aderinokun; Salamotu Aderinokun
- Children: Ire Aderinokun

Olutayo Aderinokun (May 8, 1955 – June 14, 2011) was a Nigerian entrepreneur who until his death was the CEO of Guaranty Trust Bank. He was also a recipient of the Member of the Federal Republic, one of Nigeria's prestigious national awards.

== Early life and education ==
Aderinokun's father was a technician who worked for the Nigerian Railway Corporation. He had his basic education at Baptist Day School, Kano, from 1961 to 1966. During the beginning of the Nigerian Civil War, his family relocated to Lagos where he attended Surulere Baptist School from 1966 to 1967, St. Peter's College, Abeokuta, from 1968 to 1972 and St. Gregory's Boys College, Lagos from 1973 to 1974. He proceeded to obtain a bachelor's degree in Business Administration from the University of Lagos, and much later, an MBA in International Business from the Graduate School of Management, University of California, Los Angeles in 1981.

== Career ==
Tayo Aderinokun co-founded Guaranty Trust Bank Plc in 1990 alongside Fola Adeola and served as Deputy Managing Director for 12 years between 1990 and 2002. He then became the managing director, a position he held until his passing. During his time as the CEO the bank won the following awards,

- The 2010 and 2009 best bank in Nigeria awards from the Banker Magazine
- The 2010 and 2009 best bank in Nigeria awards from Euromoney Awards for Excellence
- The SIAO 2009 and 2008 Best Corporate Social Responsibility Awards
- The 2007 Most Respected Company in Nigeria Award from PrizeWaterhouseCoopers and Businessday
- The Nigerian Stock Exchange President's Merit Award in 2003, 2005, 2007 and 2008.
