= St Augustine Academy, Maidstone =

Coordinates: 51°16′12″N 0°29′56″E

St Augustine Academy

Location
- Oakwood Road; Maidstone, Kent, ME16 8AE; England

Information
- Type: Academy
- Established: 2011
- Local authority: Kent County Council
- Department for Education URN: 136923 Tables
- Ofsted: Reports
- Principal: Steffan Ball
- Gender: Coeducational
- Age: 11 to 16
- Houses: Charity, Faith, Hope
- Colours: Grey and Purple
- Sponsor: Woodard Schools
- Website: www.saa.woodard.co.uk

St Augustine Academy is a coeducational secondary school with academy status, located in Maidstone, Kent. It is the only Church of England secondary school in the area.

The Principal is Steffan Ball. The academy moved into its new premises, located adjacent to its existing premises in the Oakwood Park complex, on completion of the first phase of a major building programme in April 2014, with the final phase completed in October 2014. The Academy's 2012/13 results place it in the top 10% of schools nationally with regard to student progress.
