= Partner2Connect =

United Nations Inter-Agency program of work

- Abbreviation: P2C
- Legal status: Active
- Headquarters: Geneva
- ITU Secretary-General: Doreen Bogdan-Martin
- Parent organization: ITU, UN (General Secretariat)
- Website: www.itu.int/itu-d/sites/partner2connect/

The Partner2Connect (P2C) Digital Coalition is a United Nations multi-Agency joint programme of work, between the International Telecommunication Union, United Nations Tech Envoy, and UN High Representative for LMICs to connect all of the world's population to the internet. The Coalition aims to extend the benefits of ICT access - such as rights, representation, education, and healthcare - to the global population, by as a first step connecting them to the global community.

== Framework ==
The Coalition's Framework of Action centers on pledges by public and private sector entities. It has four areas of action:

1. Access (Nick Read, Pamela Coke-Hamilton, Ursula Owusu)
2. Adoption (Brad Smith, Sima Sami Bahous)
3. Value Creation (Gopal Vittal, Achim Steiner)
4. Accelerate (Andile Ngcaba)

The framework is aligned with the Sustainable Development Goals, the UN Secretary-General's Roadmap on Digital Cooperation and the United Nations Common Agenda.

== Pledges ==
The Coalition gathers "pledges" of public and private sector participants. As of April 2023, $29.99B had been pledged across 118 countries, primarily LMICs.

=== Ukraine ===
As of April 2023, over $120 million has been pledged to rebuild the telecommunication section of Ukraine, as well as commitments in the form of technical support and other assistance.
