= Yutaka Matsuo =

Engineer in Japan

- 松尾 豊
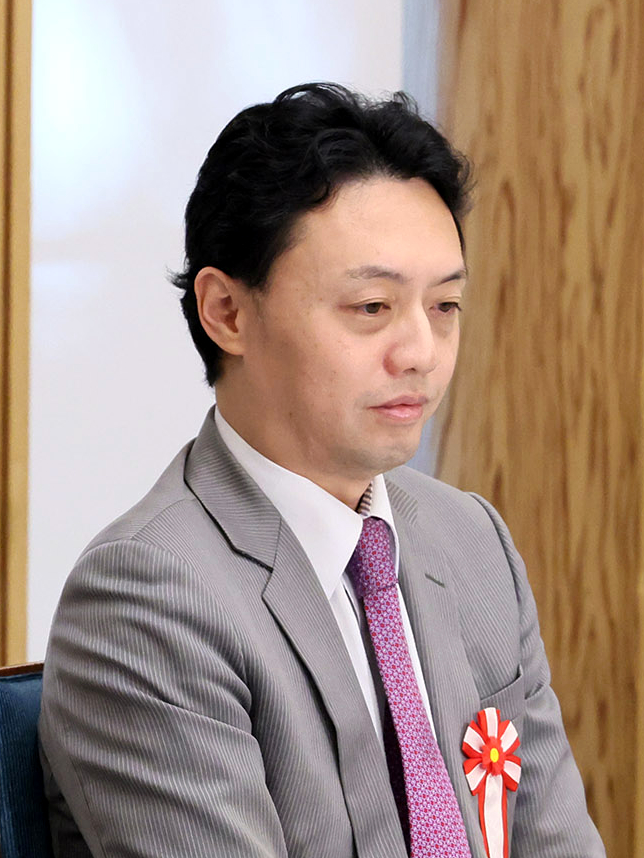
- Matsuo in 2023
- Born: Sakaide, Kagawa, Kagawa Prefecture, Shikoku, Japan

Academic background
- Education: University of Tokyo (BEng, MEng, PhD)

Academic work
- Discipline: Engineer
- Sub-discipline: Artificial intelligence, deep learning, web engineering, social media engineering
- Institutions: University of Tokyo
- Website: www.ymatsuo.com/en/

Yutaka Matsuo is a professor in the Department of Technology Management for Innovation at the University of Tokyo. He specialises in artificial intelligence and web engineering. He also focuses on real-world applications of technology and encourages his students to start their own businesses, which has led to the foundation of multiple listed companies.

== Education and background ==
Matsuo was born in Sakaide, Kagawa. His family has produced multiple noted individuals, including Yoshio Utsumi, who served as the secretary-general of the International Telecommunication Union (ITU), and Yo Matsuo, who was a pioneer in the study of living environment systems. Both of them are his uncles and were educated at the University of Tokyo (UTokyo). After attending Marugame High School in his hometown, he followed in their footsteps and attended UTokyo, where he studied at the Department of Information and Communication Engineering (電子情報工学科). He obtained his master's degree and PhD from the same institution.

== Academic career ==
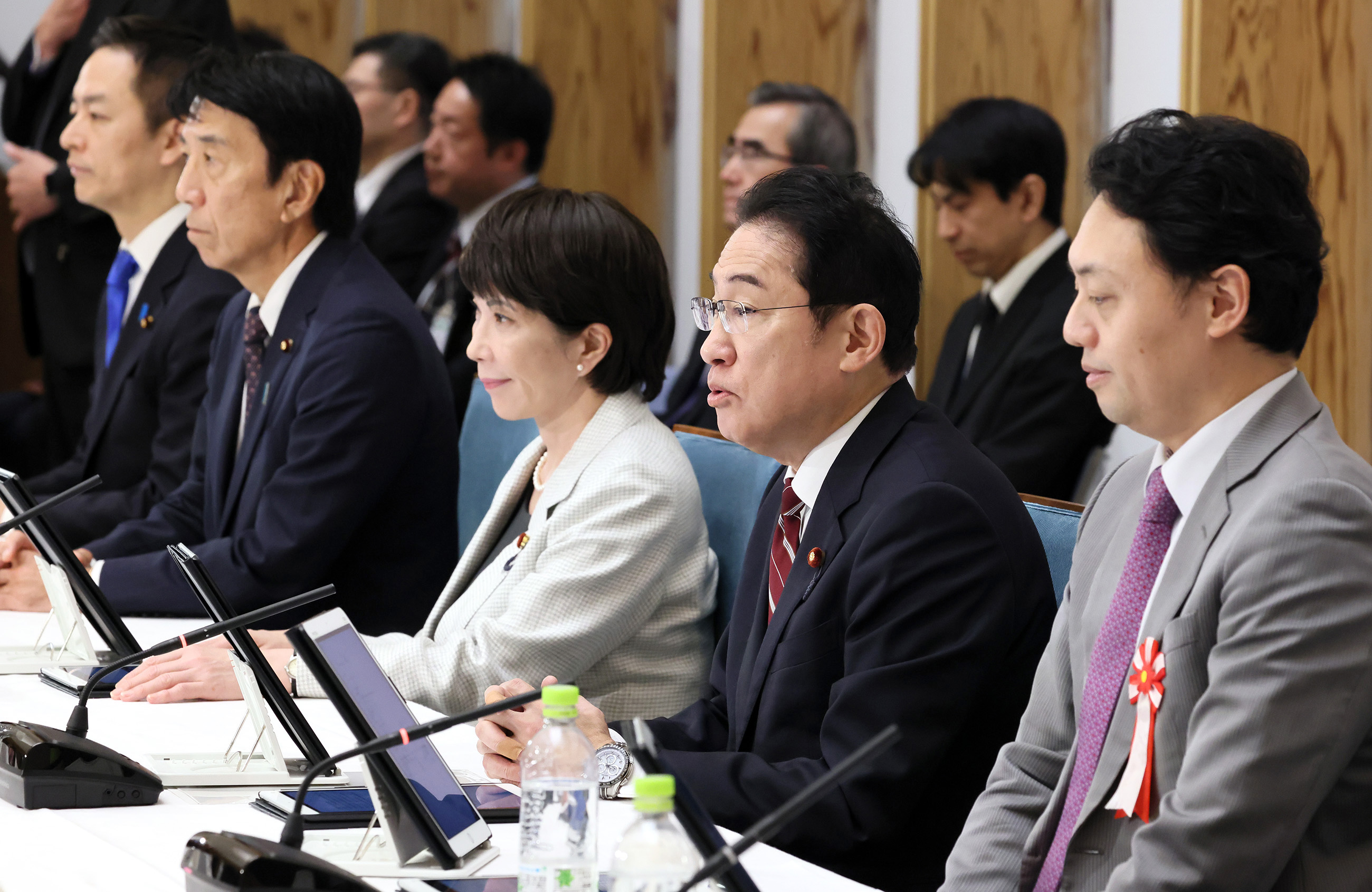
With Prime Minister Fumio Kishida, Minister of Economy, Trade and Industry Ken Saito and Minister of State for Science and Technology Policy Sanae Takaichi in December 2023

After earning a PhD in engineering from UTokyo in March 2002, he began working at the National Institute of Advanced Industrial Science and Technology. Later, he worked for the Center for the Study of Language and Information (CSLI) at Stanford University, before returning to his alma mater in October 2007 as an associate professor. He was subsequently promoted to professor and has held the position since.

He has served as an adviser in multiple government committees on science and technology policies and utilisation of information technology. He has also served as a non-executive director of the Softbank Group since June 2019. He is member of the UN Independent International Scientific Panel on AI.
