= National Security Inspectorate =

UK certification body

The National Security Inspectorate, or NSI, is an independent not for profit UKAS accredited certification body operating in the United Kingdom. It is not a Trade association. It serves to approve around 1800 professional security and fire safety providers in accordance with International, British and Industry Standards and Codes of Practise, who are listed in the NSI Company Finder.

== History ==
Formed in 1971 as the National Supervisory Council for Intruder Alarms, as a product certification organisation for installers of security alarms / burglar alarms, it merged in the 1990s with the Security Systems Inspectorate (SSI) to become the National Approval Council for Security Systems (NACOSS), and later merged with the Inspectorate of the staffed guarding Security Industry (ISI), which had formed in 1992, to become the NSI in 2001.

Around 16 million people in the UK do not have home and contents insurance on their property.

== Function ==
It provides primarily independent 3rd party certification to service providers in the security systems guarding and fire safety sectors, with the objective of raising standards in the sector. Approved Companies who are unable or unwilling to adhere to relevant standards have their approval withdrawn. It works closely with public authorities, trade associations, insurers and other in the development of standards.

=== Product certification ===
It is the main UKAS accredited product certification organisation in the UK for installers of domestic and commercial security systems such as intruder (burglar) alarms, CCTV systems and access control systems. It is the leading inspectorate of guarding services providers, and fire safety providers of fire detection/alarm systems and fire suppression systems, emergency lighting, and life fire risk assessment services.

All NSI approved companies are regularly audited, required to make good identified shortcomings. Certificates of Approval are valid for only three years and only if compliance with standards is maintained. See the NSI company finder for Approved Companies

The other main similar certification organisation is the Security Systems and Alarms Inspection Board (SSAIB) of Tyne and Wear, which offers similar services.

== See also ==
- List of professional associations in the United Kingdom
- List of regulators in the United Kingdom
