= Abdulfatai Yahaya Seriki =

Nigerian politician

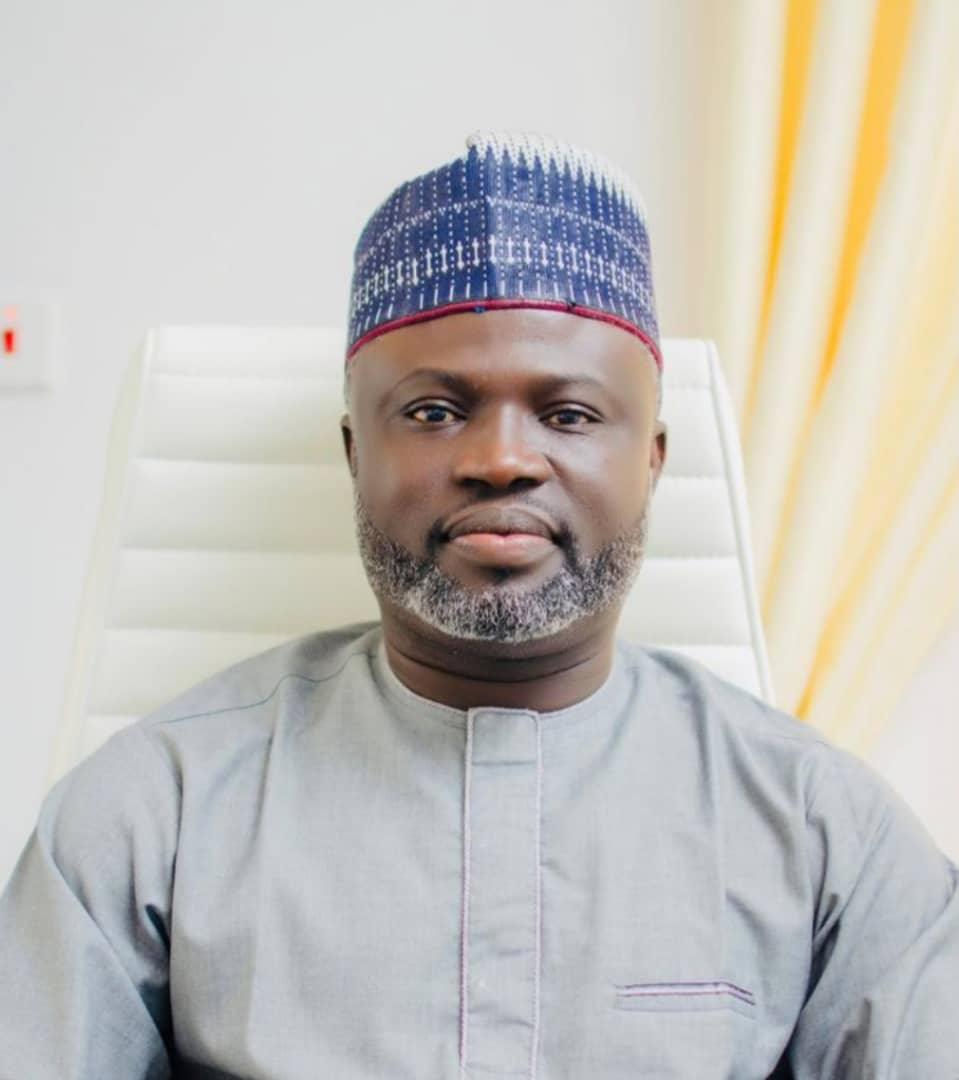

Personal details
- Born: 8 October 1975 (age 51) Jos, Plateau State, Nigeria
- Party: All Progressives Congress
- Spouse: Mrs. Fatimah Abdulfatah

Yahaya Seriki (Pronouciation)(born October 8, 1975) is an APC Chieftain from Ilorin Kwara State in North central Nigeria. Before joining active politics, Yahaya Seriki is a businessman and philanthropist. He is the Founder and managing director of Kursi Investments Limited.

== Early life ==
He was born in Kaduna and brought up in Maiduguri and Jos, the administrative capital and largest city of Plateau State. He is from Ilorin.

== Politics ==
AbdulFatai Yahaya Seriki Gambari is a former Governorship aspirant of the All Progressive Congress (APC) in the 2019 gubernatorial election in Kwara state and is also a ranking chieftain of APC in Kwara state. He was the first candidate to step down to rally support for the current Governor Abdrahman Abdulrasaq.

He served as the Director General of the campaign that produced the current Kwara State Governor Abdulrahman Abdulrasaq. He is a prominent member of the ‘O To Ge’ Movement that unseat the politics of the former senate President of Nigeria Bukola Saraki in Kwara state.

== Personal life ==
He is married to Fatimah Abdulfatah and the couple has four sons.
