= Nonye Soludo =

Nigerian computer scientist and entrepreneur (born 1970)

First Lady of Anambra State
- Incumbent
- Assumed role 17 March 2022
- Charles Soludo

Personal details
- Born: Nonye Frances Ezenwanne; 31 July 1970 (age 55) Aguata local government area
- Spouse: Charles Soludo
- Occupation: computer scientist; entrepreneur

Nonye Frances Soludo (born 31 July 1970) is a Nigerian computer scientist, entrepreneur and environmentalist who is the fifth First Lady of Anambra State since March 2022. She was named the Humanitarian First Lady of the Year by the Nigerian Humanitarian Awards and Magazine.

== Background and education ==
Soludo hails from Isuofia, Aguata local government area of Anambra state. She was born into the family of Chief Emmanuel Chukwumma Ezenwanne and Gloria Uzoamaka Ezenwanne, who were educators. She is also a niece to Professor Dora Akinyuli. Soludo obtained a bachelor's degree in Computer Science from the University of Nigeria, Nsukka in 1995. She later proceeded to do her Master of Science in Accounting and Finance from University of Westminister, UK in 2006.

In May 2025, she was conferred an honorary doctorate by the Chukwuemeka Odumegwu Ojukwu University.

== Career ==
Nonye's entrepreneurial journey started on the University of Nigeria Nsukka campus where she established the first and largest ICT centres "Queens Computers". It served as a research hub for lecturers, staff and students of the university at the time.

Nonye founded Healthy Living Foods Ltd, also known as Royal Foods, a food company based in the UK. She has been the managing director of a real estate company, Charles Frances Properties, since 2016.

She founded the non-governmental crusade, 'Healthy Living with Nonye Soludo Initiative'. As first lady she continued the initiative and received a merit award for her efforts in advancing public health by the Nigerian Medical Association.

== Environmentalism ==
Her initiative, Healthy Living with Nonye Soludo, promotes preventive healthcare, nutrition, fitness and environmental sanitation and also fosters a "culture of consciousness" around responsible lifestyles, including reducing wastes and adopting eco-friendly habits, which aligns with global sustainability goals like the UN SDGs.

Also, She leads campaigns that advocate organic farm produce over genetically modified organisms (GMOs), emphasizing soil health, biodiversity preservation, and food security in the midst of climate-induced agricultural disruptions. For this, she shows a practical example by having her own personal vegetable garden at the Light House (government house in Awka).

== Awards and recognition ==
In August 2025, Nonye was named First Lady of the Year for Health-Care and Child Support at the 2025 Nigerian Humanitarian Awards and Magazine event held in Abuja.

In 2024, she was awarded Most Supportive Governor's Wife in South-East Nigeria by the Nigerian Union of Journalists.

== Personal life ==
Nonye married Governor Charles Soludo in 1992 while working as a lecturer at the University of Nigeria, Nsukka. They have six children together.
