= Our Common Agenda =

United Nations initiative for a common global vision and agenda

- Legal status: Active
- Headquarters: New York
- UN Secretary-General: António Guterres
- Parent organization: United Nations
- Website: www.un.org/en/common-agenda

The Our Common Agenda (also known as United Nations Common Agenda) is an initiative presented by United Nations secretary-general António Guterres in September 2021. The report outlines a vision for the future based on multilateralism, international cooperation, and global solidarity, addressing a wide range of topics such as climate change, inequality, digital cooperation, human rights, peace and security, global governance, and sustainable development.

== Key proposals ==
The report includes several key proposals and recommendations:

1. A Global Summit of the Future was held in September 2024, bringing together heads of state, governments, and representatives from various sectors to discuss and agree on a common vision for the future.
2. A new global social contract, focusing on reducing inequality and investing in education, healthcare, and social protection.
3. A new Global Digital Compact, aiming to ensure that digital technologies are used responsibly and to the benefit of all.
4. A new agenda for peace, focused on conflict prevention, peacebuilding, and sustaining peace.
5. A new global deal for the environment, including an urgent transition to renewable energy and the protection of biodiversity.

== Relation to other initiatives ==
The Common Agenda initiative is related to various other international efforts, such as the Sustainable Development Goals (SDGs), and the UN Secretary-General's Roadmap on Digital Cooperation.

The Secretary-General's Youth Advisory Group on Climate Change was launched on 27 July 2020, convened under the Youth2030 strategy and Our Common Agenda, as a way for the Secretary-General to engage directly with young people on issues related to climate change. Each group has a two-year term.

== See also ==
- Category:United Nations Common Agenda
