= Sum-check protocol =

A sum-check protocol is a cryptographic protocol for the construction of interactive proof systems, used widely in zero-knowledge protocols.

== History ==
The sum-check protocol was created by Carsten Lund, Lance Fortnow, Howard Karloff, and Noam Nisan and formalized in 1990.

== Concept ==
In an interactive proof, the goal is for a verifier V to offload an expensive computation to an untrusted prover P. The sum-check protocol allows the prover to convince the verifier that the sum of a multivariate polynomial is equal to a known value. The goals of the sum-check protocol are to make the verifier run in time linear to the input size, to keep the proof logarithmically small, and to keep the prover efficient.

For a v-variate polynomial g defined over a finite field $\mathbb{F}$, the prover provides the verifier with the following sum:

$H := \sum_{b_1 \in \{0,1\}} \sum_{b_2 \in \{0,1\}} \cdots \sum_{b_v \in \{0,1\}} g(b_1, \ldots, b_v).$

Without a prover, the verifier has to perform $2^{n}$ evaluations of g to verify the statement, which is a very large runtime. With the sumcheck protocol, the verifier's runtime is $O(v + \text{[the cost to evaluate } g \text{ at a single input in } \mathbf{F}^v ])$.

== Limitations ==
=== Proof size ===
The sum-check protocol leads to proofs that are of at least logarithmic length.

=== Zero-knowledge and succinctness ===
The protocol is not zero-knowledge by itself, and like all interactive proofs, it is not succinct for NP statements.

zk-SNARK proofs combine the sum-check protocol with commitment schemes to obtain zero-knowledge and succinct arguments.

== See also ==
- Cryptographic protocol
- Interactive proof systems
- Zero-knowledge proof
