= Amir Ronen =

Israeli computer scientist (born 1965)

- אמיר רונן
- Born: 1965 (age 60–61)
- Education: Hebrew University of Jerusalem
- Occupation: Computer scientist
- Awards: Gödel Prize (2012)

Amir Ronen (Hebrew: אמיר רונן; born 1965) is an Israeli computer scientist.

== Biography ==
Ronen studied at the Hebrew University of Jerusalem, where he earned a B.Sc., M.Sc., and Ph.D. successively. He then pursued postdoctoral research at Stanford University and the University of California, Berkeley. After spending a few years as an assistant professor at the Technion, he joined the IBM Research Center in Haifa.

In 2012, Ronen received the Gödel Prize, along with Elias Koutsoupias, Christos Papadimitriou, Tim Roughgarden, Noam Nisan, and Eva Tardos, for initiating and developing a new field of research called Algorithmic Mechanism Design (AMD). This field integrates concepts from theoretical economics and game theory (Nash equilibrium) with computer science concepts such as algorithm design and complexity theory.

Ronen's work spans various areas, including algorithmic game theory, social network analysis, machine learning, and strategic analysis.

== Research Papers ==
- Algorithmic Mechanism Design. Games and Economic Behavior 35 (2001): 166–196.
- Computationally Feasible VCG Mechanisms.
- Algorithms For Rational Agents
- Mechanism design with incomplete languages
- Optimal Auctions are Hard, (April 29, 2002)
- On Approximating Optimal Auctions
