= Aram Harrow =

American quantum information theorist (born 1980)

Aram W. Harrow
- Born: April 22, 1980 (age 46); Lansing, Michigan
- Education: MIT
- Known for: HHL algorithm
- Scientific career
- Fields: Quantum information science
- Workplaces: MIT; University of Bristol; University of Washington
- Doctoral advisor: Isaac Chuang
- Other academic advisors: Neil Gershenfeld
- Website: www.mit.edu/~aram

Aram Wettroth Harrow (born 1980) is an American quantum information scientist. He has been a professor at the Massachusetts Institute of Technology since 2013.

He was born on April 22, 1980 in Lansing, Michigan to a family descended from Jewish immigrants from Eastern Europe and attended high school in East Lansing. In 2001, he received an SB from MIT and completed an undergraduate thesis in the MIT Media Lab advised by Neil Gershenfeld, also working closely with Benjamin Recht, a graduate student of Gershenfeld's.

In 2005, he received a PhD advised by MIT electrical engineering professor Isaac Chuang. From 2005 to 2010 he was a lecturer at the University of Bristol, and from 2010 to 2012 he was a postdoctoral researcher at the University of Washington. He joined MIT in 2013.

In 2008, Harrow, Avinatan Hassidim, and Seth Lloyd introduced the HHL algorithm. The algorithm was widely thought to give quantum machine learning algorithms with exponential speedups over the best classical algorithms, until the discovery by Ewin Tang of classical algorithms giving the same exponential speedups. Harrow later attempted to propose an alternative approach to quantum machine learning, although it did not become as widespread as the HHL algorithm.

In 2015, Harrow and Lior Eldar, a postdoctoral researcher at the Hebrew University of Jerusalem, announced a solution to the NLTS conjecture of Michael Freedman and Matthew Hastings, which was later modified to prove the weaker NLETS theorem after a mistake was discovered. A proof of the original NLTS conjecture was eventually given in 2023 by Anurag Anshu, Nikolas Breuckmann, and Chinmay Nirkhe.

He is on the steering committee of Quantum Information Processing (QIP), an annual quantum computing conference. He is the creator and co-administrator of SciRate, a Reddit-inspired website for voting and commenting on papers which have been submitted to arXiv.

His father was Kenneth W. Harrow, an English professor at Michigan State University known for his contributions to African literature. He is married to Shefali Oza, an epidemiology researcher at Harvard.

== Selected publications ==
- Bremner, Michael J.; Dawson, Christopher M.; Dodd, Jennifer L.; Gilchrist, Alexei; Harrow, Aram W.; Mortimer, Duncan; Nielsen, Michael A.; Osborne, Tobias J. (November 25, 2002). "Practical Scheme for Quantum Computation with Any Two-Qubit Entangling Gate". Physical Review Letters. 89 (24) 247902. arXiv:quant-ph/0207072. Bibcode:2002PhRvL..89x7902B. doi:10.1103/PhysRevLett.89.247902. PMID 12484981. S2CID 41875260.
- Devetak, I.; Harrow, A. W.; Winter, A. J. (October 2008). "A Resource Framework for Quantum Shannon Theory". IEEE Transactions on Information Theory. 54 (10): 4587–4618. arXiv:quant-ph/0512015. Bibcode:2008ITIT...54.4587D. doi:10.1109/tit.2008.928980. ISSN 0018-9448. S2CID 17767728.
- Barak, Boaz; Brandao, Fernando G. S. L.; Harrow, Aram W.; Kelner, Jonathan; Steurer, David; Zhou, Yuan (May 19, 2012). "Hypercontractivity, sum-of-squares proofs, and their applications". Proceedings of the forty-fourth annual ACM symposium on Theory of computing. ACM. pp. 307–326. arXiv:1205.4484. Bibcode:2012arXiv1205.4484B. doi:10.1145/2213977.2214006. ISBN 978-1-4503-1245-5. S2CID 937370.
