= Gödel Prize =

Computer science award

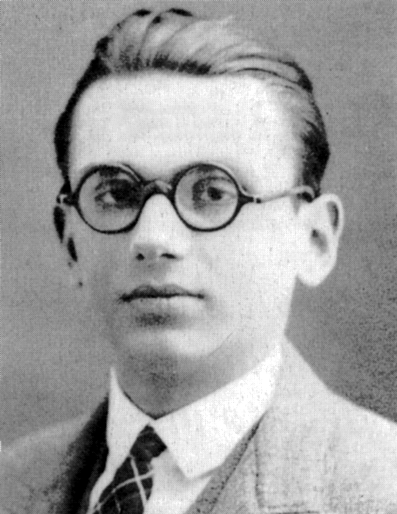
Kurt Gödel

The Gödel Prize is an annual prize for outstanding papers in the area of theoretical computer science, given jointly by the European Association for Theoretical Computer Science (EATCS) and the Association for Computing Machinery Special Interest Group on Algorithms and Computational Theory (ACM SIGACT). The award is named in honor of Kurt Gödel. Gödel's connection to theoretical computer science is that he was the first to mention the "P versus NP" question, in a 1956 letter to John von Neumann in which Gödel asked whether a certain NP-complete problem could be solved in quadratic or linear time.

The Gödel Prize has been awarded since 1993. The prize is awarded alternately at ICALP (even years) and STOC (odd years). STOC is the ACM Symposium on Theory of Computing, one of the main North American conferences in theoretical computer science, whereas ICALP is the International Colloquium on Automata, Languages and Programming, one of the main European conferences in the field. To be eligible for the prize, a paper must be published in a refereed journal within the last 14 (formerly 7) years. The prize includes a reward of US$5000.

The winner of the prize is selected by a committee of six members. The EATCS President and the SIGACT Chair each appoint three members to the committee, to serve staggered three-year terms. The committee is chaired alternately by representatives of EATCS and SIGACT.

In contrast with the Gödel Prize, which recognizes outstanding papers, the Knuth Prize is awarded to individuals for their overall impact in the field.

== Recipients ==
Year	Name(s)	Notes	Publication year
1993	László Babai, Shafi Goldwasser, Silvio Micali, Shlomo Moran, and Charles Rackoff	for the development of interactive proof systems	1988, 1989 (Note: Goldwasser, S.; Micali, S.; Rackoff, C. (1989), "The knowledge complexity of interactive proof systems" (PDF), SIAM Journal on Computing, 18 (1): 186–208, CiteSeerX 10.1.1.397.4002, doi:10.1137/0218012, ISSN 1095-7111)
1994	Johan Håstad	for an exponential lower bound on the size of constant-depth Boolean circuits (for the parity function).	1989
1995	Neil Immerman and Róbert Szelepcsényi	for the Immerman–Szelepcsényi theorem regarding nondeterministic space complexity	1988, (Note: Immerman, Neil (1988), "Nondeterministic space is closed under complementation" (PDF), SIAM Journal on Computing, 17 (5): 935–938, CiteSeerX 10.1.1.54.5941, doi:10.1137/0217058, ISSN 1095-7111) 1988
1996	Mark Jerrum and Alistair Sinclair	for work on Markov chains and the approximation of the permanent of a matrix	1989, 1989 (Note: Jerrum, M.; Sinclair, Alistair (1989), "Approximating the permanent", SIAM Journal on Computing, 18 (6): 1149–1178, CiteSeerX 10.1.1.431.4190, doi:10.1137/0218077, ISSN 1095-7111)
1997	Joseph Halpern and Yoram Moses	for defining a formal notion of "knowledge" in distributed environments	1990
1998	Seinosuke Toda	for Toda's theorem, which showed a connection between counting solutions (PP) and alternation of quantifiers (PH)	1991 (Note: Toda, Seinosuke (1991), "PP is as hard as the polynomial-time hierarchy" (PDF), SIAM Journal on Computing, 20 (5): 865–877, CiteSeerX 10.1.1.121.1246, doi:10.1137/0220053, ISSN 1095-7111, archived from the original (PDF) on 2016-03-03)
1999	Peter Shor	for Shor's algorithm for factoring numbers in polynomial time on a quantum computer	1997
2000	Moshe Y. Vardi and Pierre Wolper	for work on temporal logic with finite automata	1994
2001	Sanjeev Arora, Uriel Feige, Shafi Goldwasser, Carsten Lund, László Lovász, Rajeev Motwani, Shmuel Safra, Madhu Sudan, and Mario Szegedy	for the PCP theorem and its applications to hardness of approximation	1996, 1998, 1998 (Note: Arora, Sanjeev; Lund, Carsten; Motwani, Rajeev; Sudan, Madhu; Szegedy, Mario (1998), "Proof verification and the hardness of approximation problems" (PDF), Journal of the ACM, 45 (3): 501–555, CiteSeerX 10.1.1.145.4652, doi:10.1145/278298.278306, ISSN 0004-5411, S2CID 8561542, archived from the original (PDF) on 2011-06-10)
2002	Géraud Sénizergues	for proving that equivalence of deterministic pushdown automata is decidable	2001
2003	Yoav Freund and Robert Schapire	for the AdaBoost algorithm in machine learning	1997
2004	Maurice Herlihy, Michael Saks, Nir Shavit and Fotios Zaharoglou	for applications of topology to the theory of distributed computing	1999, (Note: Herlihy, Maurice; Shavit, Nir (1999), "The topological structure of asynchronous computability" (PDF), Journal of the ACM, 46 (6): 858–923, CiteSeerX 10.1.1.78.1455, doi:10.1145/331524.331529, S2CID 5797174. Gödel prize lecture) 2000
2005	Noga Alon, Yossi Matias and Mario Szegedy	for their foundational contribution to streaming algorithms	1999 (Note: Alon, Noga; Matias, Yossi; Szegedy, Mario (1999), "The space complexity of approximating the frequency moments" (PDF), Journal of Computer and System Sciences, 58 (1): 137–147, doi:10.1006/jcss.1997.1545. First presented at the Symposium on Theory of Computing (STOC) in 1996.)
2006	Manindra Agrawal, Neeraj Kayal, Nitin Saxena	for the AKS primality test	2004
2007	Alexander Razborov, Steven Rudich	for natural proofs	1997
2008	Daniel Spielman, Shang-Hua Teng	for smoothed analysis of algorithms	2004
2009	Omer Reingold, Salil Vadhan, Avi Wigderson	for zig-zag product of graphs and undirected connectivity in log space	2002, (Note: Reingold, Omer; Vadhan, Salil; Wigderson, Avi (2002), "Entropy waves, the zig-zag graph product, and new constant-degree expanders", Annals of Mathematics, 155 (1): 157–187, CiteSeerX 10.1.1.236.8669, doi:10.2307/3062153, ISSN 0003-486X, JSTOR 3062153, MR 1888797, S2CID 120739405) 2008 (Note: Reingold, Omer (2008), "Undirected connectivity in log-space", J. ACM, 55 (4): 1–24, doi:10.1145/1391289.1391291, ISSN 0004-5411, S2CID 207168478)
2010	Sanjeev Arora, Joseph S. B. Mitchell	for their concurrent discovery of a polynomial-time approximation scheme for the Euclidean Travelling Salesman Problem	1998, (Note: Arora, Sanjeev (1998), "Polynomial time approximation schemes for Euclidean traveling salesman and other geometric problems", Journal of the ACM, 45 (5): 753–782, CiteSeerX 10.1.1.23.6765, doi:10.1145/290179.290180, ISSN 0004-5411, S2CID 3023351) 1999
2011	Johan Håstad	for proving optimal inapproximability results for various combinatorial problems	2001 (Note: Håstad, Johan (2001), "Some optimal inapproximability results" (PDF), Journal of the ACM, 48 (4): 798–859, CiteSeerX 10.1.1.638.2808, doi:10.1145/502090.502098, ISSN 0004-5411, S2CID 5120748)
2012	Elias Koutsoupias, Christos Papadimitriou, Noam Nisan, Amir Ronen, Tim Roughgarden and Éva Tardos	for laying the foundations of algorithmic game theory	2009, 2002, (Note: Roughgarden, Tim; Tardos, Éva (2002). "How bad is selfish routing?". Journal of the ACM. 49 (2): 236–259. CiteSeerX 10.1.1.147.1081. doi:10.1145/506147.506153. S2CID 207638789.) 2001 (Note: Nisan, Noam; Ronen, Amir (2001). "Algorithmic Mechanism Design". Games and Economic Behavior. 35 (1–2): 166–196. CiteSeerX 10.1.1.21.1731. doi:10.1006/game.1999.0790.)
2013	Dan Boneh, Matthew K. Franklin, and Antoine Joux	for multi-party Diffie–Hellman key exchange and the Boneh–Franklin scheme in cryptography	2003, (Note: Boneh, Dan; Franklin, Matthew (2003). "Identity-based encryption from the Weil pairing". SIAM Journal on Computing. 32 (3): 586–615. CiteSeerX 10.1.1.66.1131. doi:10.1137/S0097539701398521. MR 2001745.) 2004
2014	Ronald Fagin, Amnon Lotem, and Moni Naor	for Optimal Aggregation Algorithms for middleware	2003,
2015	Daniel Spielman, Shang-Hua Teng	for their series of papers on nearly-linear-time Laplacian solvers	2011 2013 2014
2016	Stephen Brookes and Peter W. O'Hearn	for their invention of Concurrent Separation Logic	2007, 2007
2017	Cynthia Dwork, Frank McSherry, Kobbi Nissim, and Adam D. Smith	for the invention of differential privacy	2006
2018	Oded Regev	for introducing the learning with errors problem	2009 (Note: Regev, Oded (2009). "On lattices, learning with errors, random linear codes, and cryptography". Journal of the ACM. 56 (6): 1–40. CiteSeerX 10.1.1.215.3543. doi:10.1145/1568318.1568324. S2CID 207156623.)
2019	Irit Dinur	for her new proof of the PCP theorem by gap amplification	2007
2020	Robin Moser and Gábor Tardos	for their constructive proof of the Lovász local lemma	2010
2021	Andrei Bulatov, Jin-Yi Cai, Xi Chen, Martin Dyer, and David Richerby	for their work on the classification of the counting complexity of constraint satisfaction problems	2013 2013 2017
2022	Zvika Brakerski, Craig Gentry, and Vinod Vaikuntanathan	for their transformative contributions to cryptography by constructing efficient fully homomorphic encryption (FHE) schemes	2014, 2014
2023	Samuel Fiorini, Serge Massar, Sebastian Pokutta, Hans Raj Tiwary, Ronald de Wolf, and Thomas Rothvoss	for showing that any extended formulation for the TSP polytope or the Matching polytope has exponential size	2015, 2017
2024	Ryan Williams	for his work on circuit lower bounds and the "algorithms to lower bounds" paradigm	2011
2025	Eshan Chattopadhyay and David Zuckerman	for their work constructing "an explicit two-source extractor with polylogarithmic min-entropy, resolving a central problem in the theory of computation that had been open for almost three decades."	2016
2026	Ilias Diakonikolas, Gautam Kamath, Daniel Kane, Jerry Li, Ankur Moitra, and Alistair Stewart	for efficient algorithms to learn high-dimensional distributions in the presence of adversarial corruptions	2019

== See also ==
- List of computer science awards
