= Fotakis =

Fotakis (Greek: Φωτάκης) is a Greek surname. It is the surname of:

- Dimitris Fotakis, Greek computer scientist.
- Georgios Fotakis (born 1981), Greece national team footballer.
- Stylianos Fotakis (died 1912), Greek lawyer and revolutionary of the 1897/98 Cretan insurrection.
