= Nir Shavit =

Israeli computer scientist

- ניר שביט
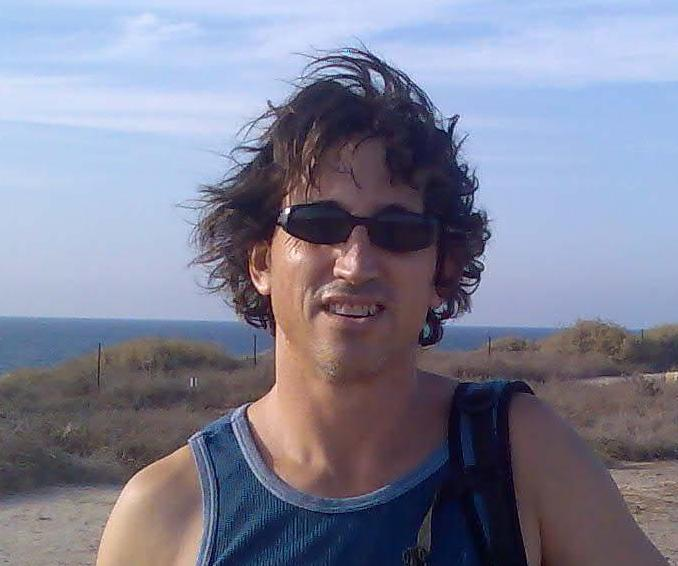
- Education: Technion, Hebrew University of Jerusalem
- Known for: Software transactional memory, wait-free algorithms
- Spouse: Shafi Goldwasser (divorced)
- Children: 3
- Awards: Gödel Prize (2004); Dijkstra prize (2012)
- Scientific career
- Fields: Computer science: concurrent and parallel computing
- Thesis: Concurrent time stamping (1990)
- Website: www.cs.tau.ac.il/~shanir/

Nir Shavit (Hebrew: ניר שביט, born 1959) is an Israeli computer scientist. He was a professor in the Computer Science Department at Tel Aviv University and is a professor in the Department of Electrical Engineering and Computer Science at the Massachusetts Institute of Technology.

Nir Shavit received B.Sc. and M.Sc. degrees in computer science from the Technion - Israel Institute of Technology in 1984 and 1986, and a Ph.D. in computer science from the Hebrew University of Jerusalem in 1990. In 2008, he published the textbook The Art of Multiprocessor Programming along with Maurice Herlihy. Since 2011, he has been a professor at MIT, where he leads the Computational Connectomics Group, focusing on techniques for designing, implementing, and reasoning about multiprocessors, and for the design of concurrent data structures.

== Recognition ==
In 2004, Shavit received the Gödel Prize in theoretical computer science along with Maurice Herlihy, Michael Saks, and Fotios Zaharoglou for work on applying tools from algebraic topology to model shared memory computability. In 2012 he received the Dijkstra Prize along with Maurice Herlihy, J. Eliot B. Moss, and Dan Touitou for the introduction and first implementation of software transactional memory. In 2013, he became a fellow of the Association for Computing Machinery. He is also a past program chair of the ACM Symposium on Principles of Distributed Computing (PODC) and the ACM Symposium on Parallelism in Algorithms and Architectures (SPAA).

He co-founded a company named Neural Magic that provided high performance inference for ML models along with Alexander Matveev. The company was sold to Red Hat in 2024

== Personal life ==
Shavit has 3 children. He was married to fellow computer scientist Shafi Goldwasser, with whom he has two sons.
