= Traffic engineering =

Traffic engineering can mean:

- Traffic engineering (transportation), a branch of civil engineering
- Teletraffic engineering, a field of statistical techniques used in telecommunications
- Internet traffic engineering, a part of network engineering involving the optimization of routing in the Internet
