= Vinod Vaikuntanathan =

Professor of Computer Science working on cryptography

- Occupation: Professor
- Known for: Homomorphic encryption
- Awards: Gödel Prize, Simons Investigator Award, Guggenheim Fellowship

Academic background
- Thesis: Randomized algorithms for reliable broadcast (2009)
- Doctoral advisor: Shafi Goldwasser

Academic work
- Discipline: Cryptography
- Institutions: MIT, CSAIL
- Website: people.csail.mit.edu/vinodv/

Vinod Vaikuntanathan is a professor of computer science at the Massachusetts Institute of Technology and a principal investigator at the MIT Computer Science and Artificial Intelligence Laboratory. His work is focused on cryptography, including homomorphic encryption. He received the 2022 Gödel Prize, together with Zvika Brakerski and Craig Gentry. He also co-founded the data start-up Duality Tech, which utilizes technologies he developed revolving around homomorphic encryption. In 2023, he received the Simons Investigator Award and in 2026, the Guggenheim Fellowship. In 2026, he co-founded the Institute for Responsible Superintelligence, a nonprofit AI safety research institute in Cambridge, Massachusetts, with Shafi Goldwasser and Adam Tauman Kalai.

== Education ==
Vaikuntanathan received his bachelor's degree in computer science from the Indian Institute of Technology Madras in 2003 and his Ph.D in computer science in 2009 from Massachusetts Institute of Technology under the supervision of Shafi Goldwasser. From 2008 to 2010, he was a Josef Raviv postdoctoral fellow at the IBM T.J. Watson Research Center, and from 2010 to 2011, a researcher at Microsoft Research. From Fall 2011 to Spring 2013, he was a professor at the University of Toronto. In Fall 2013, he joined the faculty at MIT.
