= Cooperative–competitive value =

Solution concept in game theory

The coco value (short for cooperative–competitive value) is a solution concept in game theory for two-player normal-form games with transferable utility. Introduced by Adam Kalai and Ehud Kalai, it evaluates a game by decomposing it into a cooperative component and a competitive component, and then combining the team optimum of the former with the minimax value of the latter. The associated decomposition is known as the coco decomposition.

Kalai and Kalai presented the coco value as a cooperative solution for games in which players choose actions non-cooperatively but may make binding agreements and side payments. Subsequent work has related the coco value to the value of two-person strategic games, compared it with other cooperative solution concepts for Bayesian games with side payments, studied its relation to Nash equilibrium payoffs, and examined the difficulty of extending it beyond two players.

== History ==
In Cooperation in Strategic Games Revisited (2013), Kalai and Kalai argued that in two-person strategic games with transferable utility, major variable-threat bargaining and arbitration solutions coincide. They presented the coco value as a broader theory built around that coincidence, together with a closed-form formula, an axiomatic characterization, and an extension to games with private signals.

== Definition ==
For a two-player bimatrix game with payoff matrices A and B, the coco decomposition writes the original game as the sum of two parts: a team or common-interest game, in which both players receive $(A+B)/2$ at every action profile, and a zero-sum game, in which the players receive $(A-B)/2$ and $(B-A)/2$ respectively.

In the complete-information case, the coco value is obtained by taking the maxmax value of the team component and the minimax value of the zero-sum component, then combining them into a payoff pair. Kalai and Kalai described the concept as combining efficiency in the cooperative component with strategic advantage in the competitive component.

Kalai and Kalai also showed that the decomposition is straightforward to compute from the payoff matrices and that the coco value can be computed in polynomial time.

== Axiomatic characterization ==
For two-player complete-information games, Kalai and Kalai characterized the coco value using axioms including efficiency, shift invariance, monotonicity in actions, payoff dominance, and invariance to redundant strategies. In their Bayesian extension they added monotonicity in information, under which strictly reducing a player's information cannot increase that player's value. Kalai and Kalai proved that these conditions uniquely determine the coco value.

== Subsequent work ==
Kohlberg and Neyman later wrote that the coco value coincides with the value of two-person strategic games in their broader framework for complete and incomplete information games. Andrés Salamanca compared the coco value with Roger Myerson's solution for Bayesian cooperative games with side payments, showing ex-ante utility equivalence under a verifiable-types assumption while also emphasizing differences in incentive compatibility and interim implementation.

In later research, Shiran Rachmilevitch showed that straightforward extension beyond two players is difficult: adding a mild dummy-player axiom to the two-player axioms makes them inconsistent for games with more than two players. Rachmilevitch also studied the relationship between the coco value and equilibrium payoffs in zero-sum and common-interest games, and later introduced an analogous coco decomposition in bargaining theory.

== Applications in artificial intelligence ==
In multi-agent reinforcement learning, Sodomka, Hilliard, Littman and Greenwald introduced Coco-Q, which extends coco values to stochastic games with side payments. Later work on reward-transfer contracts in multi-agent systems referred to the coco value as a focal bargaining point for negotiating fair transfers in two-player games, and cooperative-AI work has cited it as a classical measure related to the costs of competition in a game.

== Limitations ==
The coco value is usually formulated for two-player games with transferable utility and binding agreements. Salamanca argued that, in incomplete-information settings, the concept ignores some incentive-compatibility issues, is defined only ex ante, and may rely on strong ex-post observability assumptions that can limit its practical applicability.

== See also ==
- Transferable utility
- Zero-sum game
- Nash bargaining game
- Shapley value
