= Barbara Terhal =

Dutch physicist (born 1969)

Barbara M. Terhal
- Born: 1969 (age 56–57); Leiden, Netherlands
- Education: University of Amsterdam
- Known for: Coining the term "entanglement witness"; Quantum computing
- Spouse: David DiVincenzo
- Scientific career
- Fields: Physics (theoretical)
- Workplaces: RWTH Aachen University Forschungszentrum Jülich; IBM; University of Amsterdam; Delft University of Technology; California Institute of Technology
- Doctoral advisor: Paul Vitányi
- Doctoral students: Nikolas Breuckmann

Barbara M. Terhal (born 1969) is a theoretical physicist working in quantum information and quantum computing. She is a professor in the Delft Institute of Applied Mathematics at TU Delft, as well as leading the Terhal Group at QuTech, the Dutch institute for quantum computing and quantum internet, founded by TU Delft and the Netherlands Organisation for Applied Scientific Research (TNO). Her research concerns many areas in quantum information theory, including entanglement detection, quantum error correction, fault-tolerant quantum computing and quantum memories.

== Education and early life ==
Barbara Terhal was born in Leiden in 1969. Already in her early school days, she enjoyed mathematics, physics and solving puzzles.

Terhal completed her PhD Cum Laude on "Quantum Algorithms and Quantum Entanglement" at the University of Amsterdam in 1999, making her the first person to receive a PhD in quantum computing in the Netherlands. As part of her thesis, she coined the term entanglement witness and proposed their use as alternatives to Bell tests for entanglement detection.

== Career and research ==
After her PhD, Terhal joined the IBM Watson Research Centre in Yorktown Heights, New York and the California Institute of Technology (Caltech) as a postdoctoral researcher. Between 2001 and 2010, she worked at IBM on a number of topics, including low-depth quantum circuits or stoquastic Hamiltonians, perturbative gadgets for quantum simulation and quantum complexity theory. She also developed quantum protocols for remote state preparation, quantum locking and quantum data hiding.

In 2010, Terhal became a professor in theoretical physics at RWTH Aachen University. In addition, she held another position at the Forschungszentrum Jülich from 2015 - 2022. In 2017 she moved to Delft, becoming a professor at the Faculty of Electrical Engineering, Mathematics and Computer Science (EEMCS) at TU Delft and group leader at QuTech.

Since 2007, Terhal has been a fellow of the American Physical Society and has held the post of Distinguished Visiting Research Chair at the Perimeter Institute in Waterloo, Canada, since 2014.

Terhal's current research focuses on quantum error correction and its realisation in solid-state qubits. She is also interested in quantum complexity theory and how it can be used to demonstrate the power of a quantum computer.

=== Awards ===
Barbara Terhal has received the following awards:

- Awarded the Outstanding Innovation Award by IBM Research in 2007
- Elected a Distinguished Visiting Research Chair at Perimeter Institute, Waterloo, Canada in 2014
- Selected as Outstanding Referee by the American Physical Society in 2015
- Elected member of the Royal Netherlands Academy of Arts and Sciences in 2020.

== Publications ==
Her publications include:

- B.M. Terhal, "Bell Inequalities and The Separability Criterion", Physics Letters A 271, 319 (2000)
- B.M. Terhal and D.P. DiVincenzo, "Adaptive quantum computation, constant depth quantum circuits, and Arthur Merlin games", Quant. Inf. and Comp. 4:2, pp. 134–145 (2004)
- B.M. Terhal, "Quantum Error Correction for Quantum Memories", Rev. Mod. Phys. 87, 307 (2015)

She has also written an essay on the fragility of quantum information.
