= Joan Boyar =

American-Danish computer scientist

Joan Faye Boyar (born 1955, also published as Joan Boyar Plumstead) is an American and Danish computer scientist whose research interests include online algorithms, cryptology, and the computational complexity of the Boolean functions used in cryptology. She is a professor in the Department of Mathematics and Computer Science at the University of Southern Denmark.

== Early life and education ==
Boyar was born in Chicago on 18 April 1955, and majored in mathematics at the University of Chicago, graduating in 1977. She went to the University of California, Berkeley for graduate study in computer science, earning a master's degree in 1981 and completing her Ph.D. in 1983. Her doctoral dissertation, Inferring Sequences Produced by Pseudo-Random Number Generators, was supervised by Manuel Blum.

== Career and later life ==
After completing her doctorate, Boyar returned to the University of Chicago as an assistant professor of computer science in 1983. Her students there included Danish computer scientist Carsten Lund, jointly advised with Lance Fortnow and László Babai.

From 1989 to 1992, Boyar began a sequence of short-term and visiting positions, at Aarhus University in Denmark, Loyola University Chicago, and Odense University in Denmark, before obtaining a position as lektor (associate professor) at the University of Southern Denmark in 1992. She was promoted to full professor in 2017. She is married to Kim Skak Larsen, also a professor of computer science at the University of Southern Denmark, and is a Danish citizen.
