= Harry Buhrman =

Dutch computer scientist

- Education: University of Amsterdam
- Known for: Applications of the Grothendieck inequality in quantum nonlocality Quantum fingerprinting Decision tree model Communication complexity and quantum nonlocality
- Scientific career
- Fields: Computer Science, Quantum Computing
- Workplaces: Quantinuum; CWI; University of Amsterdam
- Doctoral advisor: Peter van Emde Boas
- Notable students: Ronald de Wolf, Stephanie Wehner

Harry Buhrman (born 1966) is a Dutch computer scientist, currently Chief Scientist Quantum Algorithms & Innovation at Quantinuum. He previously was Professor of algorithms, complexity theory, and quantum computing at the University of Amsterdam (UvA), group leader of the Quantum Computing Group at the Centrum Wiskunde & Informatica (CWI), and executive director of QuSoft, the Dutch research center for quantum software.

Buhrman research interests are on Quantum Computing, Quantum Information, Quantum Cryptography, Computational complexity theory, Kolmogorov Complexity, and Computational Biology.

Buhrman contributed substantially to the quantum analogue of Communication complexity, exhibiting an advantage of the use of qubits in distributed information-processing tasks. Although quantum entanglement cannot be used to replace communication, can be used to reduce the communication exponentially.

Buhrman was elected a member of the Royal Netherlands Academy of Arts and Sciences in 2020.

== Publications ==
- Harry Buhrman, Richard Cleve, John Watrous, and Ronald de Wolf, Quantum fingerprinting, Physical Review Letters 87, 167902 (2001).
- Harry Buhrman, Nishanth Chadran, Serge Fehr, Ran Gelles, Vipul Goyal, Rafail Ostrosky, and Christian Schaffner, Position-based quantum cryptography: impossibility and constructions, SIAM Journal on Computing 43, 150-178 (2014).
- Harry Buhrman, Łukasz Czekaj, Andrzej Grudka, Michał Horodecki, Paweł Horodecki, Marcin Markiewicz, Florian Speelman, and Sergii Strelchuk, Quantum communication complexity advantage implies violation of a Bell inequality, Proceedings of the National Academy of Sciences of the United States of America 113 (12), 3191-3196 (2016).
- Harry Buhrman, Richard Cleve, Serge Massar, Ronald de Wolf, Nonlocality and communication complexity, Rev. Mod. Phys. 82, 665 (2010).
