= Omer Reingold =

Israeli computer scientist

- עומר ריינגולד
- Education: Weizmann Institute of Science
- Known for: Zig-zag product
- Awards: Grace Murray Hopper Award (2005); Gödel Prize (2009); ACM Fellow
- Scientific career
- Fields: Computer science
- Workplaces: Stanford University
- Doctoral advisor: Moni Naor

Omer Reingold (Hebrew: עומר ריינגולד) is an Israeli computer scientist. He is the Rajeev Motwani professor of computer science in the Computer Science Department at Stanford University and the director of the Simons Collaboration on the Theory of Algorithmic Fairness. He received a PhD in computer science at Weizmann in 1998 under Moni Naor. He received the 2005 Grace Murray Hopper Award for his work in finding a deterministic logarithmic-space algorithm for st-connectivity in undirected graphs. He, along with Avi Wigderson and Salil Vadhan, won the Gödel Prize (2009) for their work on the zig-zag product. He became a Fellow of the Association for Computing Machinery in 2014 "For contributions to the study of pseudorandomness, derandomization, and cryptography."

== Selected publications ==
- Reingold, Omer (2008), "Undirected connectivity in log-space", Journal of the ACM, 55 (4): 1–24, doi:10.1145/1391289.1391291, S2CID 207168478.
