= Computational social choice =

Computational social choice (COMSOC) is a field at the intersection of social choice theory, theoretical computer science, and the analysis of multi-agent systems. It consists of the analysis of problems arising from the aggregation of preferences of a group of agents from a computational perspective. In particular, computational social choice is concerned with the efficient computation of outcomes of voting rules, with the computational complexity of various forms of manipulation, and issues arising from the problem of representing and eliciting preferences in combinatorial settings.

== Winner determination ==
The usefulness of a particular voting system can be severely limited if it takes a very long time to calculate the winner of an election. Therefore, it is important to design fast algorithms that can evaluate a voting rule when given ballots as input. As is common in computational complexity theory, an algorithm is thought to be efficient if it takes polynomial time. Many popular voting rules can be evaluated in polynomial time in a straightforward way (i.e., counting), such as the Borda count, approval voting, or the plurality rule. For rules such as the Schulze method or ranked pairs, more sophisticated algorithms can be used to show polynomial runtime. Certain voting systems, however, are computationally difficult to evaluate. In particular, winner determination for the Kemeny-Young method, Dodgson's method, and Young's method are all NP-hard problems. This has led to the development of approximation algorithms and fixed-parameter tractable algorithms to improve the theoretical calculation of such problems.

== Preference Representation ==
An important differentiation between voting rules is the format of ballots used by the voters to represent their preference. The two most common formats are approval ballots and ordinal ranks.

In approval ballots, each voter approves some candidates she likes. There is no further differentiation or hierarchy within the approved candidates. The same holds for the non-approved candidates. Thus, such ballots are also called dichotomous. Approval ballots are used for instance in satisfaction approval voting and proportional approval voting.

In contrast, ordinal ranks require the voter to rank all candidates from best to worst. This type of ballot is used for example in Borda's rule or in Bucklin voting.

There are many other types of ballot formats described in literature, such as truncated ranks, trichotomous ballots, or cardinal utility ballots.

Some research in computational social choice is focused on how representative ballot formats are, and on developing expressive, yet compact ballot formats. This is especially important in combinatorial settings, such as multiwinner voting.

== Strategic Manipulation and Computational Barriers ==
Strategic manipulation is an important issue in computational social choice. It happens when voters choose a vote that they think will lead to a better outcome for them instead of the candidate they actaully want to vote for. The Gibbard-Satterthwaite theorem shows that, under general conditions and with at three or more alternatives, no voting system can completely eliminate the possibility of strategic manipulation. Because of this, researchers have also looked at whether making manipulation computationally difficult could make it harder for voters to actually carry out.

One way to study this problem is to think of manipulation as a computational task. A voter might know that changing their vote could improve the final result, but they still need to figure out exactly how to vote to make that happen. For some voting rules, finding a successful manipulation has been shown to be NP-hard. In simple terms, this means that there is no known efficient algorithm that can solve every possible instance of the problem, and the amount of computation needed can grow very quickly as the size of the election increases. This has led researchers to consider computational complexity as a possible “barrier” to manipulation. Conitzer and Walsh discuss this idea in the Handbook of Computational Social Choice, examining whether making manipulation computationally difficult could reduce the ability of voters to strategically influence elections.

However, NP-hardness does not mean that every election will be difficult to manipulate. It only tells us that there are some particularly difficult cases. Conitzer, Sandholm, and Lang studied manipulation in elections with relatively small numbers of candidates and found that the number of candidates can have a significant effect on complexity. Some voting systems remain difficult to manipulate even with only a few candidates, while others become much easier. This is important because real-world elections usually involve a limited number of candidates rather than an unlimited number.

Toby Walsh also questioned whether computational complexity by itself is enough to prevent manipulation. He pointed out that worst-case NP-hardness does not necessarily mean that manipulation will be difficult in the situations that occur most often in practice. Because of this, researchers have also examined average-case complexity, approximation methods, and restrictions on voter preferences to get a better understanding of how difficult manipulation really is in realistic elections.

== Other topics ==
=== Tournament solutions ===
A tournament solution is a rule that assigns to every tournament a set of winners. Since a preference profile induces a tournament through its majority relation, every tournament solution can also be seen as a voting rule which only uses information about the outcomes of pairwise majority contests. Many tournament solutions have been proposed, and computational social choice theorists have studied the complexity of the associated winner determination problems.

=== Preference restrictions ===
Restricted preference domains, such as single-peaked or single-crossing preferences, are an important area of study in social choice theory, since preferences from these domains avoid the Condorcet paradox and thus can circumvent impossibility results like Arrow's theorem and the Gibbard-Satterthwaite theorem. From a computational perspective, such domain restrictions are useful to speed up winner determination problems, both computationally hard single-winner and multi-winner rules can be computed in polynomial time when preferences are structured appropriately. On the other hand, manipulation problem also tend to be easy on these domains, so complexity shields against manipulation are less effective. Another computational problem associated with preference restrictions is that of recognizing when a given preference profile belongs to some restricted domain. This task is polynomial time solvable in many cases, including for single-peaked and single-crossing preferences, but can be hard for more general classes.

=== Multiwinner elections ===
While most traditional voting rules focus on selecting a single winner, many situations require selecting multiple winners. This is the case when a fixed-size parliament or a committee is to be elected, though multiwinner voting rules can also be used to select a set of recommendations or facilities or a shared bundle of items. Work in computational social choice has focused on defining such voting rules, understanding their properties, and studying the complexity of the associated winner determination problems. See multiwinner voting.

== See also ==
- Algocracy
- Algorithmic game theory
- Algorithmic mechanism design
- Cake-cutting
- Fair division
- Hedonic games
