= Nikolas Breuckmann =

German mathematical physicist

Nikolas P. Breuckmann
- Born: Duisburg, Germany
- Education: RWTH Aachen University, Germany
- Known for: Proof of NLTS conjecture; Quantum computing
- Awards: James Clerk Maxwell Medal & Prize (2023)
- Scientific career
- Fields: Physics (theoretical); Mathematics; Computer science
- Workplaces: University College London; University of Bristol
- Thesis: Homological Quantum Codes Beyond the Toric Code (2017)
- Doctoral advisor: Barbara Terhal

Nikolas P. Breuckmann (born 1988) is a German mathematical physicist affiliated with the University of Bristol, England. He is, as of Spring 2024, a visiting scientist and program organizer at the Simons Institute for the Theory of Computing at the University of California, Berkeley. His research focuses on quantum information theory, in particular quantum error correction and quantum complexity theory. He is known for his work (together with Anurag Anshu and Chinmay Nirkhe) on proving the NLTS conjecture, a famous open problem in quantum information theory.

== Education and early life ==
Breuckmann was born in Duisburg and grew up in Waltrop, North Rhine-Westphalia, Germany. He earned a BSc in Mathematics and a BSc, an MSc and a PhD in Physics from RWTH Aachen University. His doctoral thesis was titled "Homological Quantum Codes Beyond the Toric Code" and he was supervised by Barbara Terhal.

== Career and research ==
After his PhD, he deferred his University College London Post-Doctoral Fellowship in Quantum Technologies funded by EPSRC for a year to work for Palo Alto-based quantum computing start-up PsiQuantum, which was co-founded by Jeremy O'Brien and Terry Rudolph (among other scientists).

In 2022, he became Lecturer (Assistant Professor) in Quantum Computing Theory at the University of Bristol.

In 2023, he was awarded the James Clerk Maxwell Medal and Prize by the Institute of Physics for his "outstanding contributions to the quantum error correction field, particularly work on proving the no low-energy trivial state conjecture, a famous open problem in quantum information theory". Quanta Magazine described the proof as "one of the biggest developments in theoretical computer science". This result built on his introduction with Jens Eberhardt of “Balanced Product Quantum Codes”.

The NLTS conjecture posits that there exist families of Hamiltonians with all low-energy states of non-trivial complexity. It was formulated in 2013 by Fields Medallist Michael Freedman and Matthew Hastings at Microsoft Research. The conjecture was proven by Breuckmann and colleagues (Anurag Anshu and Chinmay Nirkhe) by showing that the recently discovered families of constant-rate and linear-distance low-density parity-check (LDPC) quantum codes correspond to NLTS local Hamiltonians. This result is a step towards proving the quantum PCP conjecture, considered the most important open problem in quantum complexity theory.

He and his former doctoral student Oscar Higgott are inventors of a U.S. patent titled “Subsystem codes with high thresholds by gauge fixing and reduced qubit overhead”, which concerns a technique to significantly improve the performance of quantum error correction in quantum computers. Their related work was included as a major development for computer science in 2023 by Quanta.
