= Rotation map =

In mathematics, a rotation map is a function that represents an undirected edge-labeled graph, where each vertex enumerates its outgoing neighbors. Rotation maps were first introduced by Reingold, Vadhan and Wigderson (“Entropy waves, the zig-zag graph product, and new constant-degree expanders”, 2002) in order to conveniently define the zig-zag product and prove its properties. Given a vertex $v$ and an edge label $i$, the rotation map returns the $i$'th neighbor of $v$ and the edge label that would lead back to $v$.

== Definition ==
For a D-regular graph G, the rotation map $\mathrm{Rot}_G : [N] \times [D] \rightarrow [N] \times [D]$ is defined as follows: $\mathrm{Rot}_G (v,i)=(w,j)$ if the i th edge leaving v leads to w, and the j th edge leaving w leads to v.

== Basic properties ==
From the definition we see that $\mathrm{Rot}_G$ is a permutation, and moreover $\mathrm{Rot}_G \circ \mathrm{Rot}_G$ is the identity map ($\mathrm{Rot}_G$ is an involution).

== Special cases and properties ==
- A rotation map is consistently labeled if all the edges leaving each vertex are labeled in such a way that at each vertex, the labels of the incoming edges are all distinct. Every regular graph has some consistent labeling.
- A consistent rotation map can be used to encode a coined discrete time quantum walk on a (regular) graph.
- A rotation map is $\pi$-consistent if $\forall v \ \mathrm{Rot}_G(v,i)=(v[i],\pi (i))$. From the definition, a $\pi$-consistent rotation map is consistently labeled.

== See also ==
- Zig-zag product
- Rotation system
