= Tal Malkin =

Israeli-American cryptographer

- טל מלכין
- Born: 1970 (age 55–56)
- Education: Bar-Ilan University, Weizmann Institute of Science, Massachusetts Institute of Technology
- Known for: Cryptography, black-box separations, multiparty computation, tamper resilience
- Awards: Fellow of the International Association for Cryptologic Research (2020)
- Scientific career
- Fields: Cryptography
- Workplaces: Columbia University
- Doctoral advisor: Shafi Goldwasser

Tal Geula Malkin (Hebrew: טל גאולה מלכין; born 1970) is an Israeli-American cryptographer who works as a professor of computer science at Columbia University, where she heads the Cryptography Lab and the Data Science Institute Cybersecurity Center.

== Education and career ==
Malkin graduated summa cum laude from Bar-Ilan University in 1993, with a bachelor's degree in mathematics and computer science. She earned a master's degree in computer science from Weizmann Institute of Science in 1995, with the master's thesis Deductive Tableaux for Temporal Logic supervised by Amir Pnueli, and completed a Ph.D. in 2000 at the Massachusetts Institute of Technology with the dissertation A Study of Secure Database Access and General Two-Party Computation supervised by Shafi Goldwasser.

As a doctoral student, she also worked as an intern for IBM Research at the Thomas J. Watson Research Center, and as a research scientist for AT&T Labs, continuing there through 2002. In 2003 she joined Columbia University as an assistant professor of computer science, earning tenure there in 2009.

== Recognition ==
Malkin was named as a 2020 Fellow of the International Association for Cryptologic Research, "for foundational contributions, including black-box separations, multiparty computation, and tamper resilience, and for service to the IACR".
