= Carsten Lund =

Danish computer scientist (born 1963)

- Born: July 1, 1963 (age 63); Aarhus, Denmark
- Education: Aarhus University; University of Chicago
- Awards: Gödel Prize (2001)
- Scientific career
- Fields: Theoretical computer science
- Workplaces: AT&T Laboratories
- Doctoral advisor: Lance Fortnow; László Babai; Joan Boyar

Carsten Lund (born July 1, 1963) is a Danish-born theoretical computer scientist, currently working at AT&T Labs in Bedminster, New Jersey, United States.

Lund was born in Aarhus, Denmark, and received the "kandidat" degree in 1988 from the University of Aarhus and his Ph.D. from the University of Chicago in computer science. His thesis, The Power of Interaction, was chosen as an ACM 'Distinguished Dissertation'.

Lund was a co-author on two of five competing papers at the 1990 Symposium on Foundations of Computer Science characterizing complexity classes such as PSPACE and NEXPTIME in terms of interactive proof systems; this work became part of his 1991 Ph.D. thesis from the University of Chicago under the supervision of Lance Fortnow and László Babai, for which he was a runner-up for the 1991 ACM Doctoral Dissertation Award.

He is also known for his joint work with Sanjeev Arora, Madhu Sudan, Rajeev Motwani, and Mario Szegedy that discovered the existence of probabilistically checkable proofs for NP-hard problems and used them to prove hardness results for approximation problems; in 2001 he and his co-authors received the Gödel Prize for their share in these discoveries.

More recently he has published highly cited work on internet traffic engineering.

He has been working for AT&T Laboratories since August 1991.
