= Institute for Responsible Superintelligence =

AI safety research institute in Cambridge, Massachusetts

- Abbreviation: RESI
- Formation: August 2026; 3 months ago
- Founders: Shafi Goldwasser; Vinod Vaikuntanathan; Adam Tauman Kalai
- Type: Nonprofit research institute
- Headquarters: Cambridge, Massachusetts, U.S.
- Fields: AI safety
- Website: resi.org

The Institute for Responsible Superintelligence (RESI) is a nonprofit research institute in Cambridge, Massachusetts, focused on mathematical approaches to artificial intelligence safety. It was founded in 2026 by computer scientists Shafi Goldwasser, Vinod Vaikuntanathan, and Adam Tauman Kalai.

== History ==
RESI came from discussions among its founders in the spring of 2026 and launched that August. Goldwasser and Vaikuntanathan are professors at the Massachusetts Institute of Technology, while Kalai had previously worked on AI safety at OpenAI.

Initial funding came from Coefficient Giving and Schmidt Sciences, with the Edward Charles Foundation acting as the institute's fiscal sponsor. By September 2026, about 20 researchers had agreed to participate.

== Research ==
The institute seeks to develop mathematical principles and protocols that incorporate safety into the design of AI systems. Its founders have cited cryptography as a model for this approach, contrasting it with the practice of testing models and correcting misalignment after it appears, which Kalai has argued cannot provide lasting safety. At their first meeting, the founding team discussed developing methods intended to remain applicable as AI systems become more capable.

RESI also involves researchers in economics, law and ethics. Roboticist Daniela Rus, who said she intended to contribute to the institute, argued that economists, lawyers, ethicists and policymakers would be needed to address liability standards, regulatory models and risk–benefit analysis.
