= Dimitris Fotakis =

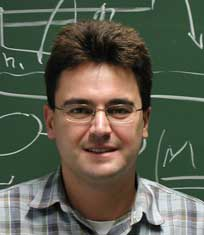
- Dimitris Fotakis
- Scientific career
- Fields: Computer science
- Institutions: National Technical University of Athens

Dimitris Fotakis (Greek: Δημήτριος (Δημήτρης) Φωτάκης) is associate professor of Theoretical Computer Science at the National Technical University of Athens. He is a prominent researcher in the field of algorithmic game theory.

Born and raised in Patras, he received a Computer Engineering Diploma (1994) and a PhD in Computer Science (1999) from the Department of Computer Engineering and Informatics, University of Patras, Greece. From September 2001 until September 2003, he was a Postdoctoral Researcher at the Max-Planck-Institut für Informatik, Algorithms and Complexity Group, Saarbrücken, Germany. Since February 2009, he has been a faculty member with the Division of Computer Science, School of Electrical and Computer Engineering, National Technical University of Athens, Greece.
