= Kenneth W. Harrow =

American scholar of African literature (1943–2024)

- Born: June 19, 1943; New York City, New York, U.S.
- Died: April 14, 2024 (aged 80); East Lansing, Michigan, U.S.
- Known for: His work on african literature, cinema studies, postcolonial theory

Academic background
- Education: Bachelor of Science
- Alma mater: Massachusetts Institute of Technology

Academic work
- Discipline: African literature, cinema studies
- Institutions: Michigan State University

Kenneth Wettroth Harrow (June 19, 1943 – April 14, 2024) was an American scholar and professor known for his contributions to African literature and cinema studies. He was a Distinguished Professor Emeritus of English at Michigan State University, where he specialized in African cinema, literature, and postcolonial theory.

== Early life and education ==
Harrow was born in The Bronx on June 19, 1943, the grandson of Jewish immigrants from Eastern Europe. He completed his undergraduate studies at the Massachusetts Institute of Technology in 1964, and his Ph.D. at New York University in 1970.

== Academic career ==
Harrow spent a significant portion of his career at Michigan State University, where he became a beloved professor and respected scholar. His work primarily focused on African literature and cinema, examining the intersections of culture, politics, and identity. Harrow's research was notable for its depth and insight into postcolonial theory, and he contributed extensively to academic discourse through his publications and lectures.

== Contributions ==
Harrow was widely recognized for his work in African cinema and literature. His scholarship helped to elevate the study of African cultural production within the academic community. Harrow was an active member of several academic organizations, including the African Studies Association and the Society for Cinema and Media Studies.

== Personal life ==
Harrow married twice and had four children, including Aram Harrow, a professor of quantum computing.

== Death and legacy ==
Harrow died in East Lansing, Michigan on April 14, 2024, at the age of 80. He was considered one of the major contemporary scholars and contributors of African studies.

== Selected publications ==
- Harrow, Kenneth W. (2007). Postcolonial African Cinema: From Political Engagement to Postmodernism. Indiana University Press.
- Harrow, Kenneth W. (1999). Less Than One and Double: A Feminist Reading of African Women's Writing. Heinemann.
- Harrow, Kenneth W. (2001). African Cinema: Postcolonial and Feminist Readings. Africa World Press.
