= Algorithmic mechanism design =

Algorithmic mechanism design (AMD) lies at the intersection of economic game theory, optimization, and computer science. The prototypical problem in mechanism design is to design a system for multiple self-interested participants, such that the participants' self-interested actions at equilibrium lead to good system performance. Typical objectives studied include revenue maximization and social welfare maximization. Algorithmic mechanism design differs from classical economic mechanism design in several respects. It typically employs the analytic tools of theoretical computer science, such as worst case analysis and approximation ratios, in contrast to classical mechanism design in economics which often makes distributional assumptions about the agents. It also considers computational constraints to be of central importance: mechanisms that cannot be efficiently implemented in polynomial time are not considered to be viable solutions to a mechanism design problem. This often, for example, rules out the classic economic mechanism, the Vickrey–Clarke–Groves auction.

== History ==
Noam Nisan and Amir Ronen first coined "Algorithmic mechanism design" in a research paper published in 1999.

== See also ==
- Algorithmic game theory
- Computational social choice
- Metagame
- Incentive compatible
- Vickrey–Clarke–Groves mechanism
