= Bach's algorithm =

For generation of random factorized numbers

Bach's algorithm is a probabilistic polynomial time algorithm for generating random numbers along with their factorization. It was published by Eric Bach in 1988. No algorithm is known that efficiently factors random numbers, so the straightforward method, namely generating a random number and then factoring it, is impractical.

The algorithm performs, in expectation, O(log n) primality tests. A simpler but less-efficient algorithm (performing, in expectation, O(log^{2} n) primality tests), is due to Adam Kalai.

Bach's algorithm may be used as part of certain methods for key generation in cryptography.

== Overview ==
Bach's algorithm produces a number $x$ uniformly at random in the range $N/2 < x \le N$ (for a given input $N$), along with its factorization. It does this by picking a prime number $p$ and an exponent $a$ such that $p^a \le N$, according to a certain distribution. The algorithm then recursively generates a number $y$ in the range $M/2 < y \le M$, where $M = N/p^a$, along with the factorization of $y$. It then sets $x = p^{a}y$, and appends $p^a$ to the factorization of $y$ to produce the factorization of $x$. This gives $x$ with logarithmic distribution over the desired range; rejection sampling is then used to get a uniform distribution.
