= Elias Koutsoupias =

Greek computer scientist

Elias Koutsoupias is a Greek computer scientist working in algorithmic game theory.

== Education ==
Koutsoupias received his bachelor's degree in electrical engineering from the National Technical University of Athens and his doctorate in computer science in 1994 from the University of California, San Diego under the supervision of Christos Papadimitriou. He subsequently taught at the University of California, Los Angeles, the University of Athens, and is now a professor at the University of Oxford.

== Career ==
In 2012, he was one of the recipients of the Gödel Prize for his contributions to algorithmic game theory, specifically the introduction of the price of anarchy concept with Papadimitriou in the paper 'Worst-case equilibria'. His work has also spanned complexity theory, design and analysis of algorithms, online algorithms, networks, uncertainty decisions and mathematical economics. In 2019, he gave a lecture on game theory at CERN.

In 2016, Koutsoupias worked with Aggelos Kiayias, Maria Kyropoulou and Yiannis Tselekounis, on the paper “Blockchain Mining Games”. He contributed aspects of game theory for stake pools in the Ouroboros consensus protocol. This was used in the Cardano blockchain, and Koutsoupias became a senior research fellow at IOHK, the blockchain engineering company developing Cardano.

== Selected publications ==
- Koutsoupias, Elias; Papadimitriou, Christos (1999), "Worst-case equilibria", Proceedings of the Annual Symposium on Theoretical Aspects of Computer Science, Trier, Germany: Springer, pp. 404–413, ISBN 3-540-65691-X
