= Salil Vadhan =

American computer scientist

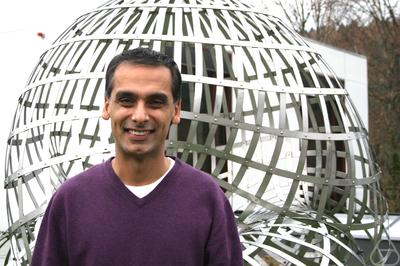
- Salil Vadhan
- Citizenship: United States
- Education: Harvard University (BA); Massachusetts Institute of Technology (PhD)
- Known for: Zig-zag product
- Awards: ACM Doctoral Dissertation Award, 2000; Gödel Prize, 2009
- Scientific career
- Fields: Computational complexity theory, Cryptography
- Workplaces: Harvard University
- Doctoral advisor: Shafi Goldwasser

Salil Vadhan is an American computer scientist. He is a Vicky Joseph Professor of Computer Science and Applied Mathematics at Harvard University. After completing his undergraduate degree in Mathematics and Computer Science at Harvard in 1995, he obtained his PhD in Applied Mathematics from Massachusetts Institute of Technology in 1999, where his advisor was Shafi Goldwasser. His research centers around the interface between computational complexity theory and cryptography. He focuses on the topics of pseudorandomness and zero-knowledge proofs. His work on the zig-zag product, with Omer Reingold and Avi Wigderson, was awarded the 2009 Gödel Prize.

== Contributions ==
=== Zig-zag graph product for constructing expander graphs ===
One of the main contributions of his work is a new type of graph product, called the zig-zag product.

Taking a product of a large graph with a small graph, the resulting graph inherits (roughly) its size from the large one, its degree from the small one, and its expansion properties from both. Iteration yields simple explicit constructions of constant-degree expanders of every size, starting from one constant-size expander.

Crucial to the intuition and simple analysis of the properties of the zig-zag product is the view of expanders as functions that act as "entropy wave" propagators—they transform probability distributions in which entropy is concentrated in one area to distributions where that concentration is dissipated. In these terms, the graph product affords the constructive interference of two such waves.

A variant of this product can be applied to extractors, giving the first explicit extractors whose seed length depends (poly)logarithmically on only the entropy deficiency of the source (rather than its length) and that extract almost all the entropy of high min-entropy sources. These high min-entropy extractors have several interesting applications, including the first constant-degree explicit expanders that beat the "eigenvalue bound."

Vadhan also came up with another simplified approach to the undirected ST-connectivity problem following Reingold's breakthrough result. Also the zig-zag product was useful in Omer Reingold's proof that SL=L.

=== Zero-knowledge proofs ===
His work in this area is to use complexity-theoretic methods to understand the power and limitations of zero-knowledge proofs. In a series of papers with Oded Goldreich and Amit Sahai, they gained thorough understanding of the class SZK of problems possessing statistical zero-knowledge proofs, characterized the class SZK and proved that SZK is closed under various operations. Recently his work was trying to work on the zero-knowledge proof beyond the confines of SZK class.

=== Randomness extractors ===
With Lu, Omer Reingold, and Avi Wigderson, he gave the first construction of randomness extractors that are "optimal up to constant factors," reaching a milestone in a decade of work on the subject.

With Trevisan, Zuckerman, Kamp, and Rao, he developed a theory of randomness extraction (and data compression) from samplable sources, which are random sources generated by an (unknown) efficient algorithm.

== Recognition ==
Vadhan was elected as an ACM Fellow in 2018 for "advancing computational complexity and cryptography, and for promoting public support for theoretical computer science."
