= Fotios Zaharoglou =

Greek computer scientist

- Education: Aristotle University of Thessaloniki; California Institute of Technology; University of California, San Diego
- Awards: Gödel Prize, 2004

Fotios Zaharoglou (Greek: Φώτιος Ζαχάρογλου) is a Greek computer scientist. He received his Diploma in Electrical Engineering from Aristotle University of Thessaloniki in 1986, his MS in Electrical Engineering from the California Institute of Technology in 1987, and his PhD in Computer Science from the University of California, San Diego in 1993. His work on the applications of topology to the theory of distributed computing along with Maurice Herlihy, Michael Saks and Nir Shavit, was awarded the 2004 Gödel Prize.
