= Ronald de Wolf =

Dutch computer scientist

- Born: 1973 (age 52–53); Zaandam
- Education: University of Amsterdam; Erasmus University Rotterdam
- Known for: Quantum fingerprinting Communication complexity Coding theory
- Scientific career
- Fields: Computer Science, Quantum Computing, Logic
- Workplaces: CWI; University of California, Berkeley
- Doctoral advisor: Harry Buhrman, Paul Vitanyi

Ronald Michiel de Wolf (born 1973) is a Dutch Computer Scientist, currently a Senior Researcher at Centrum Wiskunde & Informatica (CWI) and a professor at the Institute for Logic, Language and Computation (ILLC) of the University of Amsterdam (UvA).

His research interests are on Quantum computing, Quantum information, Coding theory, and Computational complexity theory.

His scientific contributions include the first exponential separation between one-way quantum and classical communication protocols for a partial Boolean function, and a proof that a locally decodable code (LDC) with 2 classical queries need exponential length. This suggested the use of techniques from quantum computing to prove results in "classical" computer science.

De Wolf and his coauthors received the Best Paper Award at the Annual ACM Symposium on Theory of Computing (STOC) in 2012. For the same article, they also received the 2022 STOC 10-year test of time award and the 2023 Gödel Prize.

== Publications ==
- Ronald de Wolf publications indexed by Google Scholar
- List of publications on arXiv
- Buhrman, Harry; Cleve, Richard; Watrous, John; de Wolf, Ronald (2001). "Quantum fingerprinting". Physical Review Letters. 87 (16) 167902. arXiv:quant-ph/0102001. Bibcode:2001PhRvL..87p7902B. doi:10.1103/PhysRevLett.87.167902. PMID 11690244. S2CID 1096490. 167902.
- Nienhuys-Cheng, Shan-Hwei; de Wolf, Ronald (1997). Siekmann, J.; Carbonell, J. G. (eds.). Foundations of Inductive Logic Programming. Lecture Notes in Computer Science. Springer-Verlag New York, Inc. ISBN 978-3-540-62927-6. 1228.
