= Game Theory Society =

Society to promote game theory

- Abbreviation: GTS
- Formation: 1999
- Founders: Ehud Kalai and Robert Aumann
- Website: www.gametheorysociety.org

The Game Theory Society (GTS) is a society for the promotion of research, teaching and application of game theory. It was founded in 1999 by Ehud Kalai and Robert Aumann and is registered in the Netherlands.

== Activities ==
The GTS hosts a congress every four years. The previous meetings were in Bilbao (2000), Marseille (2004), Evanston, Illinois (2008), Istanbul (2012) and Maastricht (2016).

The society is associated with two journals:

- Games and Economic Behavior
- International Journal of Game Theory

The society honors individuals by selecting them for the following named lectures:

- The Shapley Lecture is delivered by a distinguished young game theorist under the age of 40.
- The Morgenstern Lecture is delivered by an individual who has made important contributions in game theory with significant economic content.
- The von Neumann Lecture is delivered by an individual who has made important developments in game theory that are of significant mathematical interest.

In addition, the society awards the Kalai Prize to a person (or persons) who have published a significant paper at the interface of game theory and computer science.
