= Serge Massar =

Belgian physicist

- Born: 11 February 1970 (age 56); Zambia
- Awards: Gödel Prize (2023)

Academic background
- Education: Université libre de Bruxelles

Academic work
- Discipline: Physics
- Sub-discipline: Quantum information
- Institutions: Université libre de Bruxelles

Serge Alexandre Massar (born 11 February 1970) is a Belgian physicist. He studies quantum information theory, nonlinear optics, optical neural networks, and reservoir computing.

== Early life and education ==
Serge Massar was born in Zambia in 1970. He obtained a degree in physics, then a PhD under the direction of Robert Brout from the Université libre de Bruxelles (ULB) in 1991 and 1995, respectively. He completed his post-doctoral research at Tel Aviv University from 1995 to 1997, and subsequently at Utrecht University from 1997 to 1998.

== Career ==
In 1998, Massar returned to ULB as a Research Associate of the FRS-FNRS. In 2008 he became the Research Director of the FRS-FNRS.

In 2012, Massar integrated into the ULB faculty, holding the rank of "Professeur Ordinaire." His tenure as the Physics Department Director at ULB spanned 2014 to 2015. Additionally, he has been at the head of the Laboratoire d’Information Quantique at ULB since 2004.

== Recognition ==
Massar's recognition in the field includes awards such as the 2003 Alcatel-Bell Prize, the 2010 La Recherche Prize, and the best paper award at the Symposium on Theory of Computing in 2012.

He has been a member of the Royal Academy of Science, Letters, and Fine Arts of Belgium since 2021.

In 2023, he received the Gödel Prize for research on extension complexity.
