= Lance Fortnow =

American computer scientist (born 1963)

- Born: August 15, 1963 (age 63)
- Education: Cornell University; Massachusetts Institute of Technology
- Known for: Interactive proofs
- Awards: ACM Fellow, NSF Presidential Faculty Fellow, Fulbright Scholar, Nerode Prize
- Scientific career
- Fields: Computer science
- Workplaces: Illinois Institute of Technology; Georgia Tech; Northwestern University; University of Chicago
- Doctoral advisor: Michael Sipser
- Doctoral students: Carsten Lund
- Website: http://lance.fortnow.com/ http://blog.computationalcomplexity.org/

Lance Jeremy Fortnow (born August 15, 1963) is a computer scientist known for major results in computational complexity and interactive proof systems. From 2019-2026, he worked as a professor in computer science at the Illinois Institute of Technology. He served as the founding dean of the College of Computing from June 2020 to June 2025.

== Biography ==
Lance Fortnow received a doctorate in applied mathematics from MIT in 1989, supervised by Michael Sipser. Since graduation, he has been on the faculty of the University of Chicago (1989–1999, 2003–2007), Northwestern University (2008–2012) and the Georgia Institute of Technology (2012–2019) as chair of the School of Computer Science. From 1999-2003 he was a Senior Research Scientist at the NEC Research Institute.

Fortnow was the founding editor-in-chief of the journal ACM Transactions on Computation Theory in 2009. He was the chair of ACM SIGACT and succeeded by Paul Beame. He was the chair of the IEEE Conference on Computational Complexity from 2000 to 2006. In 2002, he began one of the first blogs devoted to theoretical computer science and has written for it since then. Since 2007, he has had a co-blogger, William Gasarch. In September 2009, Fortnow brought mainstream attention to complexity theory when he published an article surveying the progress made in the P versus NP problem in Communications of the Association for Computing Machinery.

In 2026, he announced that, with approximately 160 other tenured faculty members, he had been laid off from Illinois Tech.

== Work ==
In his many publications, Fortnow has contributed important results to the field of computational complexity. While still a graduate student at MIT, Fortnow showed that there are no perfect zero-knowledge protocols for NP-complete languages unless the polynomial hierarchy collapses. With Michael Sipser, he also demonstrated that relative to a specific oracle there exists a language in co-NP that does not have an interactive protocol.

In November 1989, Fortnow received an email from Noam Nisan showing that co-NP had multiple prover interactive proofs (MIP). With Carsten Lund and Howard Karloff, he used this result to develop an algebraic technique for the construction of interactive proof systems and prove that every language in the polynomial-time hierarchy has an interactive proof system. Their work was hardly two weeks old when Adi Shamir employed it to prove that IP=PSPACE. Quickly following up on this (January 17, 1990, less than two months after receiving Nisan's email) Fortnow, along with László Babai and Carsten Lund, proved that MIP=NEXP. These algebraic techniques were expanded further by Fortnow, Babai, Leonid Levin and Mario Szegedy when they presented a new generic mechanism for checking computations.

Fortnow has continued to publish on a variety of topics in the field of computational complexity including derandomization, sparse languages, and oracle machines. Fortnow has also published on quantum computing, game theory, genome sequencing and economics.

Fortnow's work in economics includes work in game theory, optimal strategies and prediction. With Duke Whang, he has examined the classic game theory problem of the prisoner's dilemma, extending the problem so that the dilemma is posed sequentially an infinite number of times. They investigated what strategies the players should take given the constraints that they draw their strategies from computationally bounded sets and introduce “grace periods” to prevent the dominance of vengeful strategies. Fortnow also examined the logarithmic market scoring rule (LMSR) with market makers. He helped to show that LMSR pricing is #P-hard and proposed an approximation technique for pricing permutation markets. He has also contributed to a study of the behavior of informed traders working with LMSR market makers.

Fortnow has also written a science book, The Golden Ticket: P, NP and the Search for the Impossible, which was loosely based on an article he had written for CACM in 2009. In his book, Fortnow provides a non-technical introduction to the P versus NP problem and its algorithmic limitations. He further describes his book and illustrates why NP problems are so important on the Data Skeptic podcast.

== Awards and honors ==
- 2007 ACM Fellow
- NSF Presidential Faculty Fellow from 1992 to 1998
- Fulbright Scholar to the Netherlands in 1996 and 1997
- 2014 Nerode Prize
