= Games and Economic Behavior =

- Discipline: Economics, game theory
- Language: English
- Edited by: Hervé Moulin

Publication details
- History: 1989–present
- Publisher: Elsevier (USA)
- Frequency: Bimonthly
- Impact factor: 1.287 (2020)

Standard abbreviations
- ISO 4: Games Econ. Behav.
- MathSciNet: Games Econom. Behav.

Indexing
- ISSN: 0899-8256
- OCLC no.: 18232121

Links
- Journal homepage

Games and Economic Behavior (GEB) is a journal of game theory published by Elsevier. Founded in 1989, the journal's stated objective is to communicate game-theoretic ideas across theory and applications. It is considered to be the leading journal of game theory and one of the top journals in economics, and it is one of the two official journals of the Game Theory Society. Apart from game theory and economics, the research areas of the journal also include applications of game theory in political science, biology, computer science, mathematics and psychology.

The founding editor-in-chief of GEB is Ehud Kalai. Current editor-in-chief is Hervé Moulin (since January 1, 2021). Each paper is initially assigned by GEB's chief editor to one of the seven editors (including himself). The chief editor has final decision authority. In August 2026 six editors and nearly 60 advisory editors resigned after the journal’s publisher decided not to renew the editor-in-chief’s contract.

== Impact factor ==
According to the Journal Citation Reports, the journal has a 2020 impact factor of 1.287 and the 5-year impact factor of 1.511.
