= Adam Tauman Kalai =

American computer scientist

- Education: Harvard University; Carnegie Mellon University
- Father: Ehud Kalai
- Scientific career
- Fields: Computer Science, Artificial Intelligence
- Workplaces: Institute for Responsible Superintelligence; OpenAI; Microsoft Research; Georgia Tech; Toyota Technological Institute at Chicago
- Thesis: Probabilistic and on-line methods in machine learning (2001)
- Doctoral advisor: Avrim Blum
- Other academic advisors: Santosh Vempala
- Website: kal.ai

Adam Tauman Kalai is an American computer scientist who specializes in artificial intelligence. He was a researcher at OpenAI from 2023 to 2026 and is a cofounder of the Institute for Responsible Superintelligence (RESI).

== Education and career ==
Kalai graduated from Harvard University in 1996 with a BA in computer science and received a MA and PhD, both in computer science, from Carnegie Mellon University in 1999 and 2001, respectively. His doctoral advisor was Avrim Blum. After graduation, Kalai did his postdoctoral research at Massachusetts Institute of Technology under Santosh Vempala until 2003. Kalai became a faculty member at the Toyota Technological Institute at Chicago from 2003 to 2006, followed by a stint as an assistant professor at Georgia Institute of Technology from 2007 to 2008. He joined Microsoft Research in 2008 and subsequently moved to OpenAI in 2023. In 2026, he left OpenAI to cofound the Institute for Responsible Superintelligence (RESI).

== Contributions ==
Kalai is known for his algorithm for generating random factored numbers (see Bach's algorithm), for co-inventing the cooperative-competitive value (coco value), for efficiently learning learning mixtures of Gaussians, for the Blum-Kalai-Wasserman algorithm for learning parity with noise, and for the intractability of the folk theorem in game theory.

In 2016 Kalai was co-author on a widely cited paper on identifying and reducing gender bias in word embeddings, which are a representation of words commonly used in AI systems. In 2026, he coauthored a Nature paper on hallucinations in large language models.

== Personal life ==
Kalai is the son of game theorist Ehud Kalai and is married to cryptographer Yael Tauman Kalai.
