= Transferable utility =

Transferable utility is a concept in cooperative game theory and in economics. Utility is transferable if one player can losslessly transfer part of its utility to another player. Such transfers are possible if the players have a common currency that is valued equally by all. Note that being able to transfer cash payoffs does not imply that utility is transferable: wealthy and poor players may derive a different utility from the same amount of money.

Transferable utility is assumed in many cooperative games, where the payoffs are not given for individual players, but only for coalitions. In this case the assumption implies that irrespective of the division of the coalitional payoff, members of the coalition enjoy the same total utility.
