= Matthew Hastings =

American physicist

- Education: Massachusetts Institute of Technology
- Known for: NLTS conjecture
- Scientific career
- Fields: Physics; Mathematics
- Workplaces: Microsoft; Duke University; Los Alamos National Laboratory

Matthew Hastings is an American physicist, currently a Principal Researcher at Microsoft. Previously, he was a professor at Duke University and a research scientist at the Center for Nonlinear Studies and Theoretical Division, Los Alamos National Laboratory. He received his PhD in physics at MIT, in 1997, under Leonid Levitov.

== Scientific contributions ==
While Hastings primarily works in quantum information science, he has made contributions to a range of topics in physics and related fields.

In 2004, he proved an extension of the Lieb-Schultz-Mattis theorem (see Lieb-Robinson bounds) to dimensions greater than one, providing foundational mathematical insights into topological quantum computing.

In 2008, he disproved the additivity conjecture for the classical capacity of quantum channels, a long-standing open problem in quantum Shannon theory.

He and Michael Freedman formulated the NLTS conjecture, a precursor to a quantum PCP theorem (qPCP).

== Awards and honors ==
He was invited to speak at the 2022 International Congress of Mathematicians in St. Petersburg in the mathematical physics section.

== Publications ==
- List of publications on arXiv
- List of Publications at Microsoft
