= Entanglement witness =

Construct in quantum information theory

In quantum information theory, an entanglement witness is a functional which distinguishes a specific entangled state from separable ones. Entanglement witnesses can be linear or nonlinear functionals of the density matrix. If linear, then they can also be viewed as observables for which the expectation value of the entangled state is strictly outside the range of possible expectation values of any separable state.

== Details ==
Let a composite quantum system have state space $H_A \otimes H_B$. A mixed state ρ is then a trace-class positive operator on the state space which has trace 1. We can view the family of states as a subset of the real Banach space generated by the Hermitian trace-class operators, with the trace norm. A mixed state ρ is separable if it can be approximated, in the trace norm, by states of the form

$$\xi = \sum_{i=1} ^k p_i \, \rho_i^A \otimes \rho_i^B,$$

where $\rho_i^A$ and $\rho_i^B$ are pure states on the subsystems A and B respectively. So the family of separable states is the closed convex hull of pure product states. We will make use of the following variant of Hahn–Banach theorem:

Theorem Let $S_1$ and $S_2$ be disjoint convex closed sets in a real Banach space and one of them is compact, then there exists a bounded functional f separating the two sets.

This is a generalization of the fact that, in real Euclidean space, given a convex set and a point outside, there always exists an affine subspace separating the two. The affine subspace manifests itself as the functional f. In the present context, the family of separable states is a convex set in the space of trace class operators. If ρ is an entangled state (thus lying outside the convex set), then by theorem above, there is a functional f separating ρ from the separable states. It is this functional f, or its identification as an operator, that we call an entanglement witness. There is more than one hyperplane separating a closed convex set from a point lying outside of it, so for an entangled state there is more than one entanglement witness. Recall the fact that the dual space of the Banach space of trace-class operators is isomorphic to the set of bounded operators. Therefore, we can identify f with a Hermitian operator A. Therefore, modulo a few details, we have shown the existence of an entanglement witness given an entangled state:

Theorem For every entangled state ρ, there exists a Hermitian operator A such that $\operatorname{Tr}(A \, \rho) < 0$, and $\operatorname{Tr}(A \, \sigma) \geq 0$ for all separable states σ.

When both $H_A$ and $H_B$ have finite dimension, there is no difference between trace-class and Hilbert–Schmidt operators. So in that case A can be given by Riesz representation theorem. As an immediate corollary, we have:

Theorem A mixed state σ is separable if and only if

$$\operatorname{Tr}(A \, \sigma) \geq 0$$

for any bounded operator A satisfying $\operatorname{Tr}(A \cdot P \otimes Q) \geq 0$, for all product pure state $P \otimes Q$.

If a state is separable, clearly the desired implication from the theorem must hold. On the other hand, given an entangled state, one of its entanglement witnesses will violate the given condition.

Thus if a bounded functional f of the trace-class Banach space and f is positive on the product pure states, then f, or its identification as a Hermitian operator, is an entanglement witness. Such a f indicates the entanglement of some state.

Using the isomorphism between entanglement witnesses and non-completely positive maps, it was shown (by the Horodeckis) that

Theorem Assume that $H_A,H_B$ are finite-dimensional. A mixed state $\sigma \in L(H_A) \otimes L(H_B)$ is separable if for every positive map Λ from bounded operators on $H_B$ to bounded operators on $H_A$, the operator $(I_A \otimes \Lambda)(\sigma)$ is positive, where $I_A$ is the identity map on $\; L (H_A)$, the bounded operators on $H_A$.
