= Internet traffic engineering =

Internet traffic engineering is defined as the aspect of network engineering dealing with the issue of performance evaluation and performance optimization of operational IP networks, notably the Internet. Traffic engineering encompasses the application of technology and scientific principles to the measurement, characterization, modeling, and control of Internet traffic.

Enhancing the performance of an operational network, at both traffic and resource levels, are major objectives of Internet engineering. This is accomplished by addressing traffic performance requirements, while utilizing the network economically and reliably. Traffic oriented performance includes packet transfer delay, packet delay variation, packet loss, and throughput.

Another important objective of Internet traffic engineering is to facilitate reliable network operations. This can be done by providing mechanisms that enhance network integrity and by embracing policies emphasizing survivability. This results in a minimization of the network to service outages arising from errors, faults and failures occurring within the infrastructure.

The Internet exists in order to transfer information from nodes to destination nodes. Accordingly, one of the most crucial functions performed by the Internet is the routing of traffic.

Ultimately, it is the performance of the network as seen by network services that is truly paramount. This crucial function should be considered throughout the development of engineering mechanisms and policies. The characteristics visible to end users are the emergent properties of the network, which are characteristics of the network when viewed as a whole. A goal of the service provider, therefore, is to enhance the properties of the network while taking economic considerations into account.

The importance of the above observation regarding the properties of networks is that special care must be taken when choosing network performance metrics to optimize. Optimizing the wrong metrics may achieve certain local objectives, but may have repercussions elsewhere.
