= Mario Szegedy =

Hungarian and American computer scientist (born 1960)

- Born: October 23, 1960 (age 65)
- Education: University of Chicago
- Awards: Gödel Prize (2001, 2005)
- Scientific career
- Fields: Computer science
- Workplaces: Rutgers University
- Thesis: Algebraic Methods in Lower Bounds for Computational Models (1989)
- Doctoral advisor: László Babai, Janos Simon

Mario Szegedy (born October 23, 1960) is a Hungarian and American computer scientist, professor of computer science at Rutgers University. He received his Ph.D. in computer science in 1989 from the University of Chicago after completing his dissertation titled Algebraic Methods in Lower Bounds for Computational Models. He held a Lady Davis Postdoctoral Fellowship at the Hebrew University of Jerusalem (1989–90), a postdoc at the University of Chicago, 1991–92, and a postdoc at Bell Laboratories (1992).

Szegedy's research areas include computational complexity theory, quantum computing, computational geometry, and computational theory.

He was awarded the Gödel Prize twice, in 2001 and 2005, for his work on probabilistically checkable proofs and on the space complexity of approximating the frequency moments in streamed data. His work on streaming algorithms and the resulting data analysis was also recognized by the 2019 Paris Kanellakis Theory and Practice Award. With computer scientists Uriel Feige, Shafi Goldwasser, László Lovász, and Shmuel Safra, Szegedy won the Test of Time Award at the 2021 IEEE Foundations of Computer Science Conference for their work titled Approximating Clique is Almost NP-Complete.

He is married and has two daughters.
