= Noam Nisan =

Israeli computer scientist

- נעם ניסן
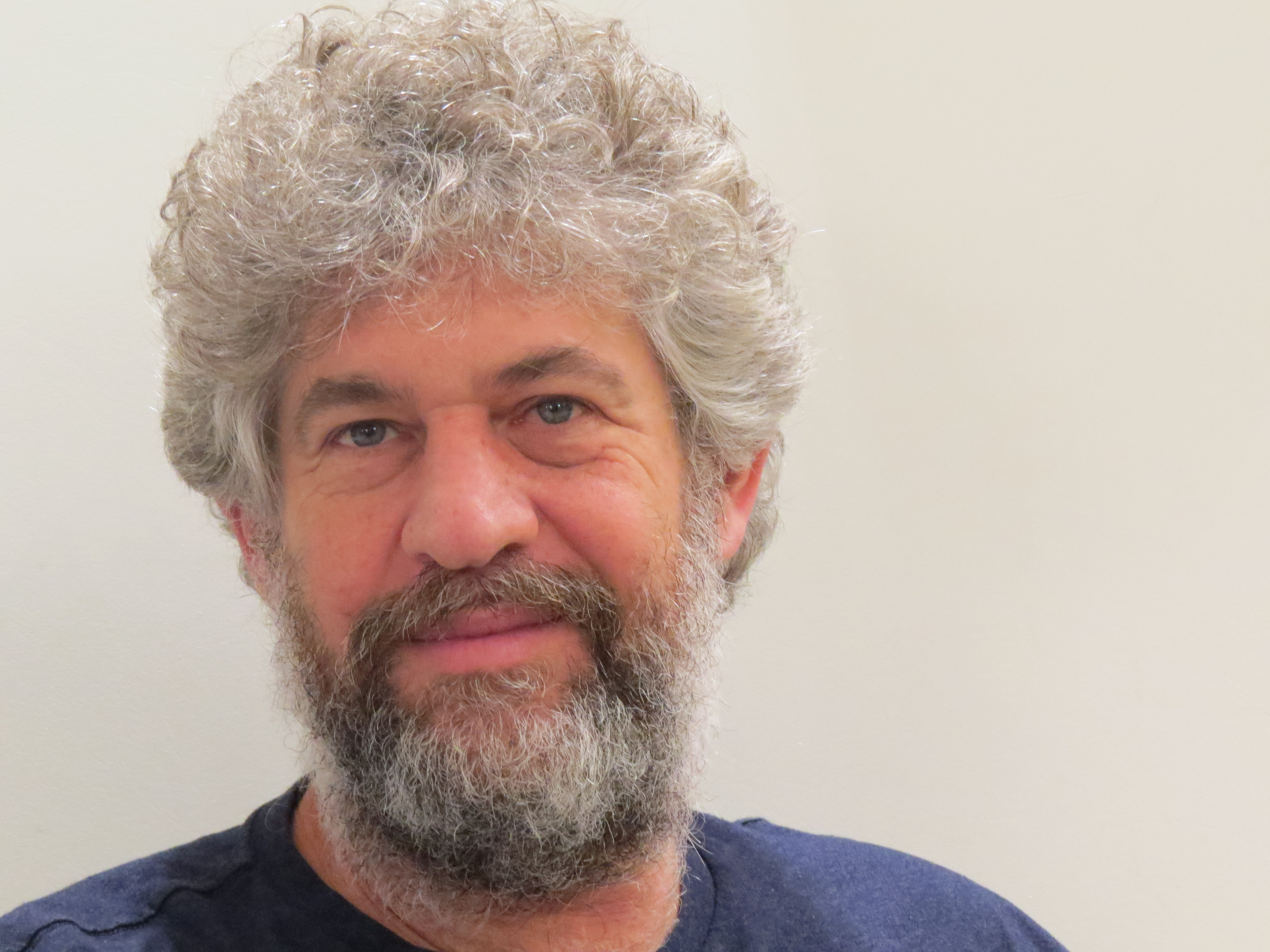
- Nisan in 2016
- Born: June 20, 1961 (age 65)
- Education: Hebrew University of Jerusalem; University of California, Berkeley
- Awards: Gödel Prize (2012); Knuth Prize (2016); EATCS Award (2018)
- Scientific career
- Fields: Computer science
- Workplaces: Hebrew University of Jerusalem; Microsoft Research
- Doctoral advisor: Richard M. Karp
- Doctoral students: Michal Parnas

Noam Nisan (Hebrew: נעם ניסן; born June 20, 1961) is an Israeli computer scientist and professor of computer science at the Hebrew University of Jerusalem. He is known for his research in computational complexity theory and algorithmic game theory.

== Biography ==
Nisan did his undergraduate studies at the Hebrew University, graduating in 1984. He went to the University of California, Berkeley, for graduate school, and received a Ph.D. in 1988 under the supervision of Richard Karp. After postdoctoral studies at the Massachusetts Institute of Technology he joined the Hebrew University faculty in 1990.

== Selected publications ==
Nisan is the author of Using Hard Problems to Create Pseudorandom Generators (MIT Press, ACM Distinguished Dissertation Series, 1992), co-author with Eyal Kushilevitz of the book Communication Complexity (Cambridge University Press, 1997), and co-author with Shimon Schocken of The Elements of Computing Systems: Building a Modern Computer from First Principles (The MIT Press, 2005). In 2007 he co-edited the book Algorithmic Game Theory (Cambridge University Press, 2007).

He has written highly cited papers on mechanism design, combinatorial auctions, the computational complexity of pseudorandom number generators, and interactive proof systems, among other topics.

== Awards and honors ==
Nisan won an ACM Distinguished Dissertation Award for his Ph.D. thesis, on pseudorandom number generators. He won the Michael Bruno Memorial Award in 2004. In 2012 he won the Gödel Prize, shared with five other recipients, for his work with Amir Ronen in which he coined the phrase "algorithmic mechanism design" and presented many applications of this type of problem within computer science.

He won the Knuth Prize in 2016 "for fundamental and lasting contributions to theoretical computer science in areas including communication complexity, pseudorandom number generators, interactive proofs, and algorithmic game theory".

In 2018 he won the Rothschild Prize and the EATCS Award for "his decisive influence on a range of areas in computational complexity theory and for algorithmic mechanism design, an elegant and rigorous computational theory that aptly informs economics".

He was named as an ACM Fellow, in the 2025 class of fellows, "for contributions to complexity theory, and for pioneering the field of economics and computation".
