= Aleksandra Korolova =

Latvian-American computer scientist

- Education: Stanford University (PhD)
- Awards: National Science Foundation CAREER Award (2020); Sloan Research Fellowship (2024); Presidential Early Career Award for Scientists and Engineers (2025)
- Scientific career
- Fields: Privacy; Fairness (machine learning)
- Workplaces: Princeton University
- Thesis: Protecting Privacy When Mining and Sharing User Data (2012)
- Doctoral advisor: Ashish Goel
- Website: www.korolova.com

Aleksandra Korolova is a Latvian–American computer scientist. She is an assistant professor at Princeton University. Her research develops privacy-preserving and fair algorithms, studies individual and societal impacts of machine learning and AI, and performs AI audits for algorithmic bias.

== Education ==
Korolova earned her undergraduate degree from the Massachusetts Institute of Technology and completed her doctoral degree at Stanford University.

== Research and career ==
=== Privacy ===
Korolova's early research examined ways to make internet searches more anonymous. Her research was one of the first to identify privacy vulnerabilities in targeted advertising systems.

Korolova's work led to the first industry deployment of differential privacy, Google's RAPPOR, demonstrating its feasibility in the local model and motivating significant interest in developing algorithms for this model of privacy in the academic literature.

RAPPOR was runner-up for the PET Award for outstanding research in privacy-enhancing technologies in 2015 and received the Association for Computing Machinery CCS Test-of-Time Award in 2025.

=== Algorithmic Fairness ===
Korolova developed new black-box audit methodologies for isolating the role of ad delivery algorithms from other confounding factors. Through the use of this tool she was able to demonstrate that people cannot opt out of ads that are based on a user's location. Her application of these methodologies demonstrated that Facebook's ad delivery algorithms lead to discriminatory outcomes in housing and employment advertising though, LinkedIn did not show a similar bias. Her research also examined a filter bubble in political ad delivery. The findings led to a 2022 settlement between the U.S. Department of Justice and Meta, requiring Meta to modify its ad delivery system.

In 2024 Korolova reported on an interaction with AI during which the AI first indicated that it had a child with special needs.

She is member of the UN Independent International Scientific Panel on AI

== Recognition ==
- Korolova's Ph.D. thesis, titled "Protecting Privacy when Mining and Sharing User Data", won the Arthur Samuel Award for outstanding Computer Science Ph.D. thesis at Stanford University.
- Korolova's work on demonstrating privacy vulnerabilities due to microtargeted advertising was recognized by the 2011 PET Award for Outstanding Research in Privacy Enhancing Technologies.
- Korolova's work on discrimination through ad delivery received an Honorable Mention at the CSCW conference in 2019.
- She is the recipient of the 2020 National Science Foundation CAREER Award, the 2024 Sloan Research Fellowship, and the 2025 Presidential Early Career Award for Scientists and Engineers (PECASE).
