= Paris Kanellakis Award =

Award in theoretical computer science

The Paris Kanellakis Theory and Practice Award is granted yearly by the Association for Computing Machinery (ACM) to honor "specific theoretical accomplishments that have had a significant and demonstrable effect on the practice of computing". It was instituted in 1996, in memory of Paris C. Kanellakis, a computer scientist who died with his immediate family in an airplane crash in South America in 1995 (American Airlines Flight 965). The award is accompanied by a prize of $10,000 and is endowed by contributions from Kanellakis's parents, with additional financial support provided by four ACM Special Interest Groups (SIGACT, SIGDA, SIGMOD, and SIGPLAN), the ACM SIG Projects Fund, and individual contributions.

== Winners ==
Year	Winners	Citation
1996	Leonard Adleman, Whitfield Diffie, Martin Hellman, Ralph Merkle, Ronald Rivest, and Adi Shamir	For "the conception and first effective realization of public-key cryptography".
1997	Abraham Lempel and Jacob Ziv	For their pioneering work in data compression, leading to their LZ algorithm which "yields the best compression rate achievable by finite-state encoders" and "can be found in virtually every modern computer".
1998	Randal Bryant, Edmund M. Clarke, E. Allen Emerson, and Kenneth L. McMillan	For "their invention of 'symbolic model checking', a method of formally checking system designs widely used in the computer hardware industry".
1999	Daniel Sleator and Robert Tarjan	For "invention of the widely used splay-tree data structure".
2000	Narendra Karmarkar	For "his theoretical work in devising an interior point method for linear programming that provably runs in polynomial time, and for his implementation work suggesting that Interior Point methods could be effective for linear programming in practice as well as theory".
2001	Eugene Myers	For "his contribution to sequencing the human genome, the complete DNA content of a human cell, and encoding all of its genes, the basic building blocks of life".
2002	Peter Franaszek	For "his seminal and sustained contributions to the theory and application of constrained channel coding".
2003	Gary Miller, Michael Rabin, Robert Solovay, and Volker Strassen	For "their contributions to realizing the practical uses of cryptography and for demonstrating the power of algorithms that make random choices", through work which "led to two probabilistic primality tests, known as the Solovay–Strassen test and the Miller–Rabin test".
2004	Yoav Freund and Robert Schapire	For their "seminal work and distinguished contributions [...] to the development of the theory and practice of boosting, a general and provably effective method of producing arbitrarily accurate prediction rules by combining weak learning rules"; specifically, for AdaBoost, their machine learning algorithm, which "can be used to significantly reduce the error of algorithms used in statistical analysis, spam filtering, fraud detection, optical character recognition, and market segmentation, among other applications".
2005	Gerard Holzmann, Robert Kurshan, Moshe Vardi, and Pierre Wolper	For "their contribution to techniques that provide powerful formal verification tools for hardware and software systems".
2006	Robert Brayton	For "his innovative contributions to logic synthesis and electronic system simulation, which have made possible rapid circuit design technologies for the electronic design automation industry".
2007	Bruno Buchberger	For "his role in developing the theory of Groebner bases, which has become a crucial building block to computer algebra, and is widely used in science, engineering, and computer science".
2008	Corinna Cortes and Vladimir Vapnik	For "their revolutionary development of a highly effective algorithm known as support vector machines (SVM), a set of related supervised learning methods used for data classification and regression", which is "one of the most frequently used algorithms in machine learning, and is used in medical diagnosis, weather forecasting, and intrusion detection among many other practical applications".
2009	Mihir Bellare and Phillip Rogaway	For "their development of practice-oriented provable security, which has resulted in high-quality, cost-effective cryptography, a key component for Internet security in an era of explosive growth in online transactions".
2010	Kurt Mehlhorn	For "contributions to algorithm engineering that led to creation of the Library of Efficient Data types and Algorithms (LEDA)", a software collection of data structures and algorithms which "has been incorporated in the applied research programs of thousands of companies worldwide in telecommunications, bioinformatics, computer-aided design (CAD) and geographic information systems (GIS), banking, optical products, and transportation".
2011	Hanan Samet	For "pioneering research on quadtrees and other multidimensional spatial data structures for sorting spatial information, as well as his well-received books, which have profoundly influenced the theory and application of these structures".
2012	Andrei Broder, Moses S Charikar and Piotr Indyk	For "their groundbreaking work on locality-sensitive hashing that has had great impact in many fields of computer science including computer vision, databases, information retrieval, machine learning, and signal processing".
2013	Robert D. Blumofe, and Charles E. Leiserson	For "contributions to efficient and robust parallel computation through both provably efficient randomized scheduling protocols and a set of parallel-language primitives constituting the Cilk framework". They developed provably efficient randomized work stealing scheduling algorithms, and Cilk, a small set of linguistic primitives for programming multithreaded computations.
2014	James Demmel	For "contributions to algorithms and software for numerical linear algebra used in scientific computing and large-scale data analysis."
2015	Michael Luby	For "groundbreaking contributions to erasure correcting codes, which are essential for improving the quality of video transmission over the Internet."
2016	Amos Fiat and Moni Naor	For "the development of broadcast encryption and traitor tracing systems".
2017	Scott Shenker	For "pioneering contributions to fair queueing in packet-switching networks, which had a major impact on modern practice in computer communication."
2018	Pavel A. Pevzner	For "pioneering contributions to the theory, design, and implementation of algorithms for string reconstruction and to their applications in the assembly of genomes."
2019	Noga Alon, Phillip Gibbons, Yossi Matias and Mario Szegedy	For "seminal work on the foundations of streaming algorithms and their application to large-scale data analytics."
2020	Yossi Azar, Andrei Broder, Anna Karlin, Michael Mitzenmacher, and Eli Upfal	For "the discovery and analysis of balanced allocations, known as the power of two choices, and their extensive applications to practice."
2021	Avrim Blum, Irit Dinur, Cynthia Dwork, Frank McSherry, Kobbi Nissim, and Adam D. Smith	For "fundamental contributions to the development of differential privacy."
2022	Michael Burrows, Paolo Ferragina, and Giovanni Manzini	For "inventing the BW-transform and the FM-index that opened and influenced the field of Compressed Data Structures with fundamental impact on data compression and computational biology."
2023	Guy Blelloch, Julian Shun, and Laxman Dhulipala	For "contributions to algorithm engineering, including the Ligra, GBBS, and Aspen frameworks which revolutionized large-scale graph processing on shared-memory machines."
2024	Hugo Krawczyk	For "pioneering and lasting contributions to the theoretical foundations of cryptographically secure communications, and to the protocols that form the security foundations of the Internet."
2025	Erdal Arıkan	For "the discovery of channel polarization and the construction of polar codes—the first explicit, capacity-achieving codes with efficient encoding and decoding adopted in global wireless standards."

== See also ==
- List of computer science awards
