= LDP =

LDP may refer to:

== Politics ==
- Liberal Democratic Party (disambiguation), several parties of this name or similar
- Laban ng Demokratikong Pilipino, the Philippines
- Lebanese Democratic Party, Lebanon
- League for Democracy Party, Cambodia
- Liberal Democratic Party (Australia)
- Liberal Democratic Party of Germany, East Germany
- Liberal Democratic Party (Japan)
- Liberal Democratic Party (Serbia)
- Liberal Democratic Party (Turkey)
- Liberal Democratic Party (Malaysia)
- Liberia Destiny Party, Liberia
- Lithuanian Democratic Party

== Technology ==
- Label Distribution Protocol, a routing protocol used in Multiprotocol Label Switching networks
- Laser designator pod
- LaserDisc player
- Linked Data Platform, a Semantic Web specification
- Linux Documentation Project
- Local differential privacy, in information privacy

== Mathematics ==
- Large deviation principle, the rate function in mathematics

== Locations ==
- Damansara–Puchong Expressway or Lebuhraya Damansara–Puchong (LDP), an expressway in Malaysia
- Long-distance footpaths in the UK (long-distance paths)
- Los Dominicos Park, a park in Santiago, Chile

== Language ==
- Lingwa de planeta, a conlang mentioned in Worldlang

== Other uses ==
- Loan deficiency payments, in U.S. agriculture policy
- Local development plan, in Wales
- Long day plant, that flowers after a short night
- Long Distance (Skateboard) Pumping
- Leadership development Program, a professional development programme
- Lou Diamond Phillips, American actor
