= Ernesto Durán Castro =

Chilean ceramist and visual artist

Ernesto David Durán Castro (born April 14, 1948 in Santiago, Chile) is a Chilean visual artist, ceramic craftsman and sculptor. His work focuses mainly on pottery and ceramics from pre-Columbian cultures, along with the representation of the ancestral human figure. His technique is inspired by his artisan family heritage of santeros and potters.

== Biography ==
His career tied to arts began at the age of 11, with his formal apprenticeship at the Liceo Experimental Artístico de Santiago, which led him in 1965 to study in the Department of Ornamental Public Art at the School of Arts of the University of Chile, to graduate in 1969, and later to teach from 1970 to 1975 as an assistant academic at the same institution.

At the same time, during his time as a university student, he began to participate in different activities related to working with ceramics, spending the summer periods of January and February for a period of four consecutive years: in 1966, he participated in the reconstruction of the Ahüi Fort in the Chiloé Province; then in 1967, he conducted popular ceramics and drawing workshops in San Carlos de Ñuble; in 1968, he again participated in conservation work for the historical site of the Matilla town in Tarapacá; finally, in 1969, he conducted popular ceramics workshops in Vicuña, in the region of Coquimbo; and finally, in 1969, he conducted popular ceramics workshops in Vicuña, in the Coquimbo Region.

== Work ==
His first works were statuettes of rural children between the years 65 and 67. The motifs of the countryside would become a main vein in his work during his early years and since the 90's and his ceramic work in the particular orange clay of the region, focuses on pre-Columbian cultures, especially the Atacameño, Diaguita, Mapuche and Selkʼnam cultures.

Oil and acrylic painting is also another area of the artist's work, where geometric patterns and singular motifs of the clothing of the ancestral figures stand out, which are colored in their entirety with earth tones.

Teaching and career

1967: Academic Ad. Honorem, in the Department of Ornamental Public Art, Former School of Stonemasonry and Ornamental Ceramics, University of Chile.

1968 - 1974: Assistant Instructor, Ornamental Ceramics Course, in the Department of Ornamental Public Art. Former School of Stonemasonry and Ornamental Ceramics of the University of Chile.

2013 - 2016: Sculpture Instructor, School of Architecture. Faculty of Arts, Humanities and Sciences, Universidad Mayor.

2015: Workshop Instructor of pre-Columbian pottery, Chimkowe Cultural Center. Cultural Corporation of the Municipality of Peñalolén.

2015: Teaching demonstrative-expositive workshops in the program, "Rutas Patrimoniales de las Artes Visuales de Peñalolén", Chimkowe Cultural Center. FONDART Metropolitan Region.

Since the beginning of his career and parallel to his work activities, he also teaches private art courses in his atelier in Peñalolén.

== Exhibitions and Distinctions ==
Year	Location	Expositions y Fairs
1968	Santiago, Chile	Exposición de arte contemporáneo. Facultad de Bellas Artes Universidad de Chile, Instituto de Extensión de Artes Plásticas, MAC
1972	Vicuña, Chile	Mural de cerámica: Homenaje a Gabriela Mistral
1972	Santiago, Chile	"Motivos Criollos"
1974	Santiago, Chile	Obras del profesorado. Facultad de Bellas Artes Universidad de Chile
1974	Santiago, Chile	"Grabado". Facultad de Bellas Artes Universidad de Chile
1975	Santiago, Chile	“Retrospectiva” de “Motivos criollos 1972”. Galería Instituto Chileno Norteamericano de Cultura
1975	Santiago, Chile	“Terracotas”. Galería del Instituto Chileno Norteamericano de Cultura
1975	Ñuñoa, Santiago	Grupo “Semilla”. Casa de la Cultura de Ñuñoa
1975	Valparaíso, Chile	II Bienal Internacional de Arte
1977	Ñuñoa, Santiago	"Grabado". Casa de la Cultura
1978	Ñuñoa, Santiago	Exposición “Taller Tierra”: Pintura y cerámica. Casa de la Cultura de Ñuñoa
1978	Providencia, Santiago	Exposición “Taller Tierra”: Cerámica y grabado. Colegio San Ignacio El Bosque
1978	Arica, Chile	Pinturas. Exposición Coordinadora Bolsas de Cesantes Zona Norte
1984	Ginebra, Suiza	“Art Populaire Chilien”. Galerie Zodiaque, Perroy 1984
1986	Arica, Chile	VI Feria de Artesanía. Universidad de Tarapacá
1989	Concepción, Chile	Feria Internacional de Arte Popular
1999	Santiago, Chile	“Mujer Luna”. VI Bienal Latinoamericana de Cerámica Artística y Artesanal, MAC
2004	Las Condes, Santiago	Exposición colectiva: Homenaje a Pablo Neruda. Centro de Artesanía del Pueblito de Los Dominicos
2005	Ñuñoa, Santiago	Pinturas. Exposición Universidad Metropolitana de Ciencias de la Educación
2007	Santiago, Chile	Exposición de Ex Alumnos 1947-2007, 60 años del Liceo Experimental Artístico
2008	Santiago, Chile	“Tierra”. Biblioteca Nacional de Santiago
2008	Concepción, Chile	“El gran triunfador”, 50 años Corporación Cultural Artistas del Acero. Sala Exposiciones de Concepción
2008	Talcahuano, Chile	“El gran triunfador”, Corporación Cultural Artistas del Acero. Sala Exposiciones Compañía Siderúrgica Huachipato S.A.
2011	Santiago, Chile	38° Feria Internacional de artesanía tradicional. Universidad Católica de Chile
2016	Peñalolén, Santiago	Taller de Cerámica Ancestral, Circuito de Artes visuales. Cumbre Internacional de Cultura de Mercociudades
2019	Peñalolén, Santiago	Ruta del Arte Visual. Día del Patrimonio, Corporación Cultural Chimkowe
2021	Santiago, Chile	"Mujeres", Artífices en Pandemia, Museo de la Educación Gabriela Mistral. Ministerio de las Culturas, las Artes y el Patrimonio
2023	Tiltil, Santiago	"Personajes Ancestrales". Corporación Municipal de Cultura, Centro Cultural Tiltil
2023	La Paz, Bolivia	III Encuentro de Ceramistas. Noviembre 2023, Facultad de Arquitectura, Universidad Mayor de San Andrés

Year	Location	Awards
1974	Santiago, Chile	1er Premio, Fiesta de la Primavera
2001	Linares, Chile	2do Premio, Concurso de Arte Público, Escuela España
2010	Santiago, Chile	Reconocimiento por su al fomento y desarrollo de la artesanía: Día nacional del artesano, CNCA Metropolitana cultura
2015	Santiago, Chile	Fondart 2015. “Rutas Patrimoniales de las Artes Visuales de Peñalolén” del Ministerio de las Culturas, las Artes y el Patrimonio
2021	Santiago, Chile	Fondart 2020-2021. Proyecto colectivo "Artífices en Pandemia" del Ministerio de las Culturas, las Artes y el Patrimonio
2023	Santiago, Chile	Fondart 2023. Proyecto colectivo "Murales con Historia" del Ministerio de las Culturas, las Artes y el Patrimonio
2024	Concepción, Chile	Premio a la Tradición Artesanal. 59 Feria Internacional de Arte Popular

== Style and art collection ==
The statuettes of Duran gather themes related to the Andean culture, the Tawantisuyo among other pre-Columbian cultures, but also reflects contemporary issues in the attire or accessories of the personifications. Something unique that he developed during the 2021 together with the jeweler Brenda Gonzalez, were some ceramic pieces of the female figure during the pandemic, where the pieces wear surgical masks.

Pieces by the artisan are auctioned on international preservation and art curation platforms such as Catawiki of the Netherlands, Chairish of the United States or Selency (OLX) of France.

"My work emerges from the thoughts I make of the human being, from the memory that prevails from the primitive ancient pre-Columbian cultures, recreating and creating through images, shapes and color, a language replete with symbolism. The searching of rites and myths that concretize a rigorous work to be captured in painting, sculpture, craftsmanship as well as engraving. Through these expressions I present universal themes, where the human being is the center of space and time".

== Read also ==
- Samuel Román
- Centro Cultural La Moneda

== Bibliography ==
1. Corporación Cultural de Peñalolén. Memoria Artística Cultural Peñalolén. 2020. (p. 316 y 370). ISBN 978-956-9222-06-1
2. Corporación Cultural de Peñalolén. Memoria oral y geografía social de las y los fundadores de Peñalolén. 2023. (p. 31). ISBN 978-956-9222-07-8
3. Muñoz González, Eduardo (1976). «Restauración del lagar de Matilla». Serie Documentos de Trabajo (Grupo de Arqueología y Museos. Univ. de Chile, Sede Antofagasta).
4. Plath, Oreste. (1972). Arte Popular y Artesanías de Chile. Universidad de Chile Museo de Arte Popular Americano Facultad de Bellas Artes.
