= Shuchi Chawla =

Indian computer scientist

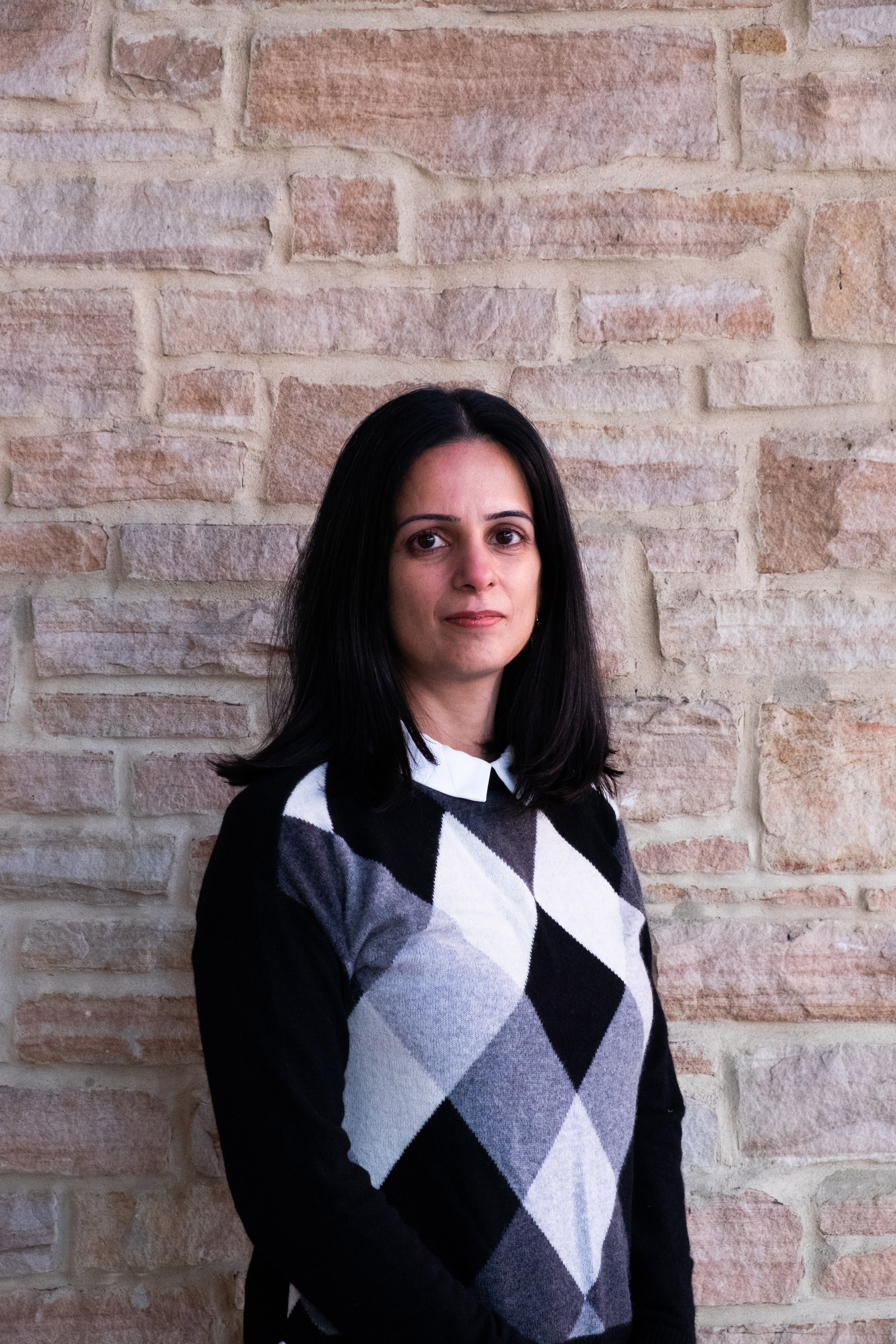
- Education: IIT Delhi; Carnegie Mellon University
- Known for: algorithms research
- Awards: NSF Career Award; Sloan Research Fellowship; Kavli Frontiers of Science Fellow
- Scientific career
- Fields: Computer science
- Workplaces: University of Texas at Austin

Shuchi Chawla is an Indian computer scientist who works in the design and analysis of algorithms, and is known for her research on correlation clustering,^{[CC]} information privacy,^{[PD]} mechanism design,^{[MD]} approximation algorithms,^{[AO]} hardness of approximation,^{[HA]} and algorithmic bias. She works as a professor of computer science at the University of Texas at Austin.

== Education and career ==
Chawla earned a bachelor's degree from the Indian Institute of Technology Delhi in 2000, and received her Ph.D. from Carnegie Mellon University in 2005. Her dissertation, Graph Algorithms for Planning and Partitioning, was supervised by Avrim Blum. After postdoctoral studies at Stanford University under the mentorship of Tim Roughgarden, and at Microsoft Research, Silicon Valley, she joined the Wisconsin faculty in 2006.. She joined the UT-Austin faculty in 2021. She won a Sloan Research Fellowship in 2009, and was named a Kavli Fellow in 2012.

== Selected publications ==
MC.	Blum, Avrim; Chawla, Shuchi (2001), "Learning from labeled and unlabeled data using graph mincuts" (PDF), Proceedings of the Eighteenth International Conference on Machine Learning (ICML '01), San Francisco, CA, USA: Morgan Kaufmann, pp. 19–26, ISBN 1-55860-778-1.

CC.	Bansal, Nikhil; Blum, Avrim; Chawla, Shuchi (July 2004), "Correlation clustering" (PDF), Machine Learning, 56 (1–3): 89–113, doi:10.1023/b:mach.0000033116.57574.95, S2CID 207582394.

PD.	Chawla, Shuchi; Dwork, Cynthia; McSherry, Frank; Smith, Adam; Wee, Hoeteck (2005), "Toward privacy in public databases" (PDF), in Kilian, Joe (ed.), Theory of Cryptography: Second Theory of Cryptography Conference, TCC 2005, Cambridge, MA, USA, February 10-12, 2005, Proceedings, Lecture Notes in Computer Science, vol. 3378, Springer, pp. 363–385, doi:10.1007/978-3-540-30576-7_20, ISBN 978-3-540-24573-5.

HA.	Chawla, Shuchi; Krauthgamer, Robert; Kumar, Ravi; Rabani, Yuval; Sivakumar, D. (2006), "On the hardness of approximating multicut and sparsest-cut", Computational Complexity, 15 (2): 94–114, doi:10.1007/s00037-006-0210-9, MR 2243123.

AO.	Blum, Avrim; Chawla, Shuchi; Karger, David R.; Lane, Terran; Meyerson, Adam; Minkoff, Maria (2007), "Approximation algorithms for orienteering and discounted-reward TSP", SIAM Journal on Computing, 37 (2): 653–670, doi:10.1137/050645464, MR 2318723. Previously announced in the Proceedings of the 44th Annual IEEE Symposium on Foundations of Computer Science, 2003.

MD.	Chawla, Shuchi; Hartline, Jason D.; Malec, David L.; Sivan, Balasubramanian (2010), "Multi-parameter mechanism design and sequential posted pricing" (PDF), Proceedings of the Forty-Second ACM Symposium on Theory of Computing (STOC '10), New York, NY, USA: ACM, pp. 311–320, arXiv:0907.2435, doi:10.1145/1806689.1806733, ISBN 978-1-4503-0050-6, S2CID 53036431.
