= Dinur =

Dinur (Hebrew: דינור), Di-Nur, De-Nur (Hebrew: די-נור) are Hebrew language surnames. Notable people with the surname include:

- Ben-Zion Dinur (1883–1973), Zionist activist, educator, historian, and Israeli politician
- Yehiel De-Nur (1909–2001), Jewish writer
- Irit Dinur, Israeli mathematician
- Raanan Dinur (born 1952), Israeli civil servant
- Rimona De-Nur (born 1943), Israeli writer, poet, ad translator
