= Jorge E. Galán =

Argentinian biologist and scientist

Jorge E. Galan
- Education: PhD Cornell University, 1986 DMV National University of La Plata, Argentina, 1980 Postdoctoral fellow Washington University in St. Louis
- Occupation: Microbiologist
- Known for: Type III Protein Secretion Systems, Salmonella & Campylobacter
- Awards: Robert Koch Prize Hans Sigrist Prize MERIT Award National Institutes of Health

Jorge Enrique Galán is an Argentinian-American microbiologist who specializes in infectious disease, bacterial pathogenesis including Salmonella.

== Research ==
Galán started his career as an associate professor at SUNY Stony Brook in the Department of Molecular Genetics and Microbiology. In 1998, Galan joined the Yale University faculty. He runs the Galán Laboratory at Yale University School of Medicine which studies the "molecular mechanisms of pathogenesis of Salmonella and Campylobacter". Galan's lab takes

a multidisciplinary approach that include[s] bacterial genetics, animal models, cell biology, immunology, and structural biology approaches. [They] aim to define the functional and...the atomic interface between these pathogens and their hosts and...to provide the bases for the development of novel prevention and therapeutic strategies to combat infectious diseases that are a global public health concern.

Galan discovered that certain microbes use a molecular machine called a type III secretion system (T3SS, large, needle-like complexes of more than 30 proteins) to infect and replicate within eukaryotic cells. A number of disease-causing Gram-negative bacteria, including Salmonella, Shigella, Yersinia, and Chlamydia, also deploy T3SSs, which makes the system a potential therapeutic target for the next generation of antibiotics.'

Galan’s lab features a cross-disciplinary approach to understanding an essential feature of the pathogenicity of Salmonella and Campylobacter — i.e., the ability of host cell and pathogen to engage in a two-way biochemical interaction, or cross talk. Understanding these mechanism has already led to the identification of several ways to intervene in infections of these bacteria, which cause millions of illnesses each year.

He is the Lucille P. Markey professor of Microbial Pathogenesis at Yale School of Medicine.

== Awards ==
Member, National Academy of Medicine, USA (2019)

MERIT Award National Institutes of Health (2015)

Member, National Academy of Sciences USA (2012)

Robert Koch Prize, Robert Koch Foundation 2011

Fellow, American Association for the Advancement of Science (2011)

Alexander M. Cruickshank Award. Grodon Research Conferences (2010)

ISI Highly cited researcher in Microbiology (2009)

Member, German Academy of Science Leopoldina (2009)

Senior Scholar Award in Global Infectious Diseases, Ellison Medical Foundation 2004

Hans-Sigrist Prize, Hans-Sigrist-Foundation, Berne, Switzerland (2002)

MERIT Award, National Institutes of Health (2000)

Searle-Chicago Community Trust Scholar (1991)

Sinsheimer Scholar in the Biomedical Sciences, Sinsheimer Foundation (1991)

Pew Scholar in the Biomedical Sciences, Pew Foundation (1990)
