= Maria-Florina Balcan =

Romanian-American computer scientist

Nina Balcan
- Born: Maria-Florina Balcan; Romania
- Education: University of Bucharest; Carnegie Mellon University (PhD)
- Awards: Sloan Research Fellowship (2014); Grace Murray Hopper Award (2019)
- Scientific career
- Fields: Machine learning Algorithmic game theory Theoretical computer science
- Workplaces: Carnegie Mellon University; Microsoft Research; Georgia Institute of Technology
- Thesis: New Theoretical Frameworks for Machine Learning (2008)
- Doctoral advisor: Avrim Blum
- Website: www.cs.cmu.edu/~ninamf/

Maria-Florina (Nina) Balcan is a Romanian-American computer scientist whose research investigates machine learning, algorithmic game theory, theoretical computer science, including active learning, kernel methods, random-sampling mechanisms and envy-free pricing. She is Cadence Design Systems Professor of computer science at Carnegie Mellon University.

== Education ==
Balcan is originally from Romania, and earned a bachelor's degree in 2000 from the University of Bucharest, earning summa cum laude honors with a double major in mathematics and computer science. She continued at the University of Bucharest for a master's degree in computer science in 2002, and then earned a PhD in computer science in 2008 from Carnegie Mellon University where her research was supervised by Avrim Blum.

== Career and research ==
After working as a postdoctoral researcher at Microsoft Research New England, she was appointed assistant professor in the Georgia Institute of Technology College of Computing in 2009. She returned to Carnegie Mellon as a faculty member in 2014, receiving tenure in 2016.

Balcan served as program committee co-chair for three major machine learning conferences, including COLT 2014, the International Conference on Machine Learning (ICML) 2016, and the Conference on Neural Information Processing Systems (NeurIPS) 2020. She was the general chair for ICML 2021.

=== Awards and honors ===
Balcan is a Microsoft Faculty Fellow (2011), a Sloan Research Fellow (2014) and a Kavli Frontiers of Science Fellow (2015). She was awarded the 2019 Grace Murray Hopper Award by the Association for Computing Machinery (ACM), for her "foundational and breakthrough contributions to minimally-supervised learning". She is a 2021 Simons Investigator.

Balcan was named as an ACM Fellow, in the 2023 class of fellows, for "contributions to the foundations of machine learning and its applications to algorithmic economics and algorithm design". She was elected an AAAI Fellow in 2025.
