= List of implementations of differentially private analyses =

Since the advent of differential privacy, a number of systems supporting differentially private data analyses have been implemented and deployed. This article tracks real-world deployments, production software packages, and research prototypes.

== Real-world deployments ==
Name	Organization	Year Introduced	Notes	Still in use?
OnTheMap: Interactive tool for exploration of US income and commute patterns.	US Census Bureau	2008	First deployment of differential privacy	Yes
RAPPOR in Chrome Browser to collect security metrics	Google	2014	First widespread use of local differential privacy	No
Emoji analytics; analytics. Improve: QuickType, emoji; Spotlight deep link suggestions; Lookup Hints in Notes. Emoji suggestions, health type usage estimates, Safari energy drain statistics, Autoplay intent detection (also in Safari)	Apple	2017		Yes
Application telemetry	Microsoft	2017	Application usage statistics Microsoft Windows.	yes
Flex: A SQL-based system developed for internal Uber analytics	Uber	2017		Unknown
2020 Census	US Census Bureau	2018		Yes
Audience Engagement API	LinkedIn	2020		Yes
Labor Market Insights	LinkedIn	2020		Yes
COVID-19 Community Mobility Reports	Google	2020		Unknown
Advertiser Queries	LinkedIn	2020		
U.S. Broadband Coverage Data Set	Microsoft	2021		Unknown
College Scorecard Website	IRS and Dept. of Education	2021		Unknown
Ohm Connect	Recurve	2021		
Live Birth Dataset	Israeli Ministry of Health	2024		Yes

== Production software packages ==
These software packages purport to be usable in production systems. They are split in two categories: those focused on answering statistical queries with differential privacy, and those focused on training machine learning models with differential privacy.

=== Statistical analyses ===
Name	Developer	Year Introduced	Notes	Still maintained?
Google's differential privacy libraries	Google	2019	Building block libraries in Go, C++, and Java; end-to-end framework in Go.	Yes
OpenDP	Harvard, Microsoft	2020	Core library in Rust, SDK in Python with an SQL interface.	Yes
Tumult Analytics	Tumult Labs	2022	Python library, running on Apache Spark.	Yes
PipelineDP	Google, OpenMined	2022	Python library, running on Apache Spark, Apache Beam, or locally.	Yes
PSI (Ψ): A Private data Sharing Interface	Harvard University Privacy Tools Project.	2016		No
TopDown Algorithm	United States Census Bureau	2020	Production code used in the 2020 US Census.	No

=== Machine learning ===
Name	Developer	Year Introduced	Notes	Still maintained?
Diffprivlib	IBM	2019	Python library.	Yes
TensorFlow Privacy	Google	2019	Differentially private training in TensorFlow.	Yes
Opacus	Meta	2020	Differentially private training in PyTorch.	Yes

== Research projects and prototypes ==
Name	Citation	Year Published	Notes
PINQ: An API implemented in C#.		2010	
Airavat: A MapReduce-based system implemented in Java hardened with SELinux-like access control.		2010	
Fuzz: Time-constant implementation in Caml Light of a domain-specific language.		2011	
GUPT: Implementation of the sample-and-aggregate framework.		2012	
$\epsilon$KTELO: A framework and system for answering linear counting queries.		2018	

== See also ==
- Differential Privacy
- Secure multi-party computation
