= Hans Sigrist Prize =

The Hans Sigrist Prize is awarded by the Hans Sigrist Foundation, at the University of Bern in Switzerland. The Foundation's benefactor Hans Sigrist died on December 30, 1982. The Foundation was founded in 1993. The Foundation's first award was presented in 1994.

The Hans Sigrist Prize is for mid-career researchers in order to boost those researcher's potential impact. Every year, the Foundation asks faculty members at the University of Bern to propose a prize field. The Foundation board chooses a field from those proposals and selects a chair for the prize search committee. Two former Hans Sigrist prize winners have gone on to win Nobel prizes later in their careers.

The Hans Sigrist Doctoral Fellowship is an up to three year Fellowship for doctoral candidates at the University of Bern. Its field changes with the field chosen for that year's Hans Sigrist Prize.

Year	Field	Hans Sigrist Prize Winner	Hans Sigrist Fellow
2025	Climate Justice	Christina Voigt	
2024	mRNA-based Vaccines and Therapeutics	Kizzmekia Corbett-Helaire	
2023	Computer Science	Aaron Roth	
2021	CyTOF Technology for Immunology	Garry Nolan	
2020	Physiology	Amanda Sferruzzi-Perri	
2019	Astrophysics	Ignas Snellen	Kathryn Jones
2018	Sustainable Animal Farming	Marina Von Keyserlingk	Janine Braun
2017	History and Religion	Heleen Murre-van den Berg	Rahel Schär
2016	Climate studies	Gabriele Hegerl	Stamatina Makri
2015	Antibiotic Resistance	Luciano Marraffini	Odette Bernasconi
2014	History	Jennifer Klein	Mathieu Lavoyer
2013	Stem Cell Biology	Yoshiki Sasai	William Hariton
2012	Biophotonics	Stephen Boppart	Kai Gerrrit Held
2011	Political Economy	Nicola Lacey	Anna Conninx
2010		No prize awarded	David Weibel Bartholomaus Wissmath
2009	Neuroscience	Patrik Vuilleumier	Johannes Klein
2008	Ancient sites	Andreas Feldtkeller	
2007		No prize awarded	Friederike Zeeh
2006	Ecology	David M. Richardson	Oliver Bossdorf
2005	Genetics	Stephen Elledge	Georg Lutz
2004	Public Policy	Christopher Pollitt	Sacha Zala
2003	Politics and Religion	Emilio Gentile	Claudia Spadavecchia
2002	Microbes	Jorge Galàn	Erik Vassella
2001	Alzheimer ́s disease	Jan Johansson	Ohad S. Parnas
2000	Biblical Gender Studies	Elsa Tamez	Lorenz E. Baumer
1999	Gender History	Joan W. Scott	Werner Eugster
1998	Biochemistry	Gerald F. Joyce	Eliane Marti
1997	RNA	Jack W. Szostak^{N}	Andreas Lienhard
1996		Frantisek Smahel	Petra S. Hueppi
1995	Healthcare Cost Research	Joseph P. Newhouse	
1994		H. Robert Horvitz^{N}	Michael Gerfin

^{N} Later won a Nobel Prize
