= Jamie Morgenstern =

American computer scientist

Jamie Heather Morgenstern is an American computer scientist specializing in fairness in machine learning and algorithmic game theory. She is an associate professor in the Paul G. Allen School of Computer Science and Engineering at the University of Washington.

Morgenstern was an undergraduate at the University of Chicago, where in 2010 she received a double bachelor's degree in computer science and mathematics. She went to Carnegie Mellon University for doctoral study in computer science, supervised by Avrim Blum, received a master's degree in 2012, and completed her Ph.D. in 2015. Her dissertation was Market Algorithms: Incentives, Learning, and Privacy.

After postdoctoral research as a Warren Fellow of Computer Science and Economics at the University of Pennsylvania, Morgenstern became an assistant professor of computer science at Georgia Tech in 2018. She moved to the University of Washington in 2019.
