= Elsa Támez =

Mexican liberation theologian and biblical scholar (born 1950)

- Born: 1950 (age 75–76); Victoria, Mexico
- Occupation: Theologian
- Known for: Feminist Liberation Theologian and Biblical Scholar
- Notable work: Bible of the Oppressed; Struggles for Power in Early Christianity; Jesus and Courageous Women

Elsa Támez (born 1950) is a Mexican liberation theologian and biblical scholar. Her writings on feminist theology and contextual biblical criticisms brought new perspectives to these fields of study, laying the foundation for later scholars. Her books include Bible of the Oppressed, The Amnesty of Grace, and Struggles for Power in Early Christianity: A Study of the First Letter of Timothy (2007). She is Professor Emerita at the Universidad Biblica Latinamericana in Costa Rica. She was appointed president of Universidad Biblica Latinamericana in 1995, becoming their first woman president.

== Biography ==
Elsa Támez was born in 1950, in Victoria, Mexico. Raised in the Presbyterian Church, she later joined the Methodist Church. As a young woman, she decided that she wanted to study theology. At that time, women were not accepted into seminaries in Mexico, so she moved to Costa Rica in 1969. She studied at the National University of Costa Rica, graduating with a Bachelor's degree in 1973. She then attended Universidad Biblica Latinamericana, where she earned a Licentiate in Theology in 1979. She earned a second Licentiate in Literature and Linguistics from the National University of Costa Rica in 1986. She later travelled to Switzerland, where she received her Doctorate in Theology from the University of Lausanne in 1990. Her doctoral thesis, Contra toda condena: La justificación por la fe desde los excluidos, was published in 1991.

Támez was Professor of Biblical Studies at the Universidad Biblica Latinamericana in the 1980s. During her career, she has written extensively on Latin American feminist biblical criticism and theology, examining biblical texts in light of the experiences and insights of Latin American women. Her first book, La Biblia de los oprimidos: la opresión en la teología bíblica, was published in Spanish in 1979. Translated into English, it was published in 1982 as Bible of the Oppressed. Támez was active in the early development of the Ecumenical Association of Third World Theologians (EATWOT), and joined with other women from the global south to advocate for a women's commission to be established within EATWOT, to provide support and engagement for women's contributions to theology. She has also been active as a consultant with the Sociedades Bíblicas Unitas. After several decades of teaching, she was appointed as the president of Universidad Biblica Latinamericana in 1995, becoming the first woman to lead the institution. In 2002, she was the Ernest Monrad Family Visiting Professor of World Christianity at Harvard Divinity School. She has also taught at Vanderbilt University.

She edited a volume of Latin American women's theology, Through Her Eyes, in 1989. She published The Amnesty of Grace: Justification by Faith from a Latin American Perspective, in 1993. She has written in depth analysis of the epistles in the New Testament, and has published a book on James as well as First Timothy. Her essay on Hagar entitled, "The Woman who Complicated the History of Salvation," was included in New Eyes for Reading: Biblical and Theological Reflections by Women from the Third World. Her article on "Cultural Violence against Women in Latin America" was included in Women Resisting Violence: Spirituality for Life.

In 2000, she was awarded the Hans Sigrist Prize, issued by the University of Bern, in Switzerland. This allowed her to work on a study of the first letter of Timothy, a text that had not been given much study by Latin American scholars. She later published a book on the epistle, Struggles for Power in Early Christianity.

She also authored the commentary on Phillipians in the Wisdom Commentary, a feminist biblical commentary published in 2017.

Támez is married with two children, and now lives in Colombia.

== Published works ==
- Bible of the Oppressed (1982, reprint 2006) - ISBN 1597525553, 978-1597525558
- with Leodardo Boff, Teólogos de la liberación hablan sobre la mujer (1986)
- Through Her Eyes: Women's Theology from Latin America (1989, reprint 2006) (ed.) ISBN 1597524999, 9781597524995
- The Amnesty of Grace: Justification by Faith from a Latin American Perspective (1993)
- The Scandalous Message of James: Faith without Works is Dead (1990) ISBN 0940989565, 9780940989566
- When the Horizons Close: Re-reading Ecclesiastes (2000, reprint 2006)
- Jesus and Courageous Women (2001)
- Struggles for Power in Early Christianity: A Study of the First Letter of Timothy (2007)
- No discriminen a los pobres. Lectura de Santiago (2008)
- El Nuevo Testamento, Palabra por Palabra, interlineal griego-español (2012)

== See also ==
- Liberation Theology
- Feminist Theology
- Biblical Criticism
- Elsa Támez (Spanish Wikipedia)
