= Differential privacy composition theorems =

Differential privacy composition theorems are mathematical tools used in differential privacy to analyze and bound the accumulated privacy loss when multiple differentially private mechanisms are applied to the same dataset. They quantify how privacy guarantees degrade as more queries or analyses are performed, and are essential for designing complex differentially private systems and algorithms.

For example, if user submits multiple queries to a differentially private database, each query might individually satisfies ε-differential privacy but the repeated interaction can cumulatively leak more information than intended. Composition theorems address this by providing a way to calculate the overall privacy loss after multiple mechanisms have been applied.

== Background ==
Differential privacy is a property of a randomized algorithm, or mechanism, M, which takes a database as input and produces an output. Informally, a mechanism is differentially private if each possible output is nearly as likely whether or not any one individual's data is included in the input. Formally, M is $(\varepsilon,\delta)$-differentially private if, for every pair of neighboring databases x and y (databases differing in the data of a single individual) and every set S of possible outputs,
$$\Pr[M(x)\in S] \;\le\; e^{\varepsilon}\,\Pr[M(y)\in S] + \delta,$$
where the probability is taken over the random choices of M. Smaller values of ε and δ correspond to stronger privacy. When δ = 0 the mechanism is called ε-differentially private.

The definition is closed under post-processing: applying any data-independent function to the output of a differentially private mechanism cannot weaken its guarantee. Composition theorems specifically address what guarantee results when several differentially private mechanisms are combined.
