= Adam D. Smith =

American computer scientist

Adam Davison Smith
- Education: McGill University (BSc); Massachusetts Institute of Technology (PhD)
- Scientific career
- Fields: Computer science
- Workplaces: Boston University
- Thesis: Maintaining Secrecy when Information Leakage is Unavoidable (2004)
- Doctoral advisor: Madhu Sudan
- Website: cs-people.bu.edu/ads22//index.html

Adam D. Smith is a computer scientist at Boston University, where he is a founding member of the Faculty of Computing & Data Sciences. His areas of research include cryptography and information privacy. He is known, along with Cynthia Dwork, Frank McSherry, and Kobbi Nissim, as one of the co-inventors of differential privacy, for which he won the 2017 Gödel Prize.
