= Frank McSherry =

Computer scientist

Frank McSherry is a computer scientist. McSherry's areas of research include distributed computing and information privacy.

McSherry is known, along with Cynthia Dwork, Adam D. Smith, and Kobbi Nissim, as one of the co-inventors of differential privacy, for which he won the 2017 Gödel Prize. Along with Kunal Talwar, he is the co-creator of the exponential mechanism for differential privacy, for which they won the 2009 PET Award for Outstanding Research in Privacy Enhancing Technologies.

McSherry has also made notable contributions to stream processing systems. In 2019, he founded a startup company for streaming databases called Materialize, where he is currently chief scientist and Chief Technology Officer.
