= Los Dominicos Park =

Chilean public park

Los Dominicos
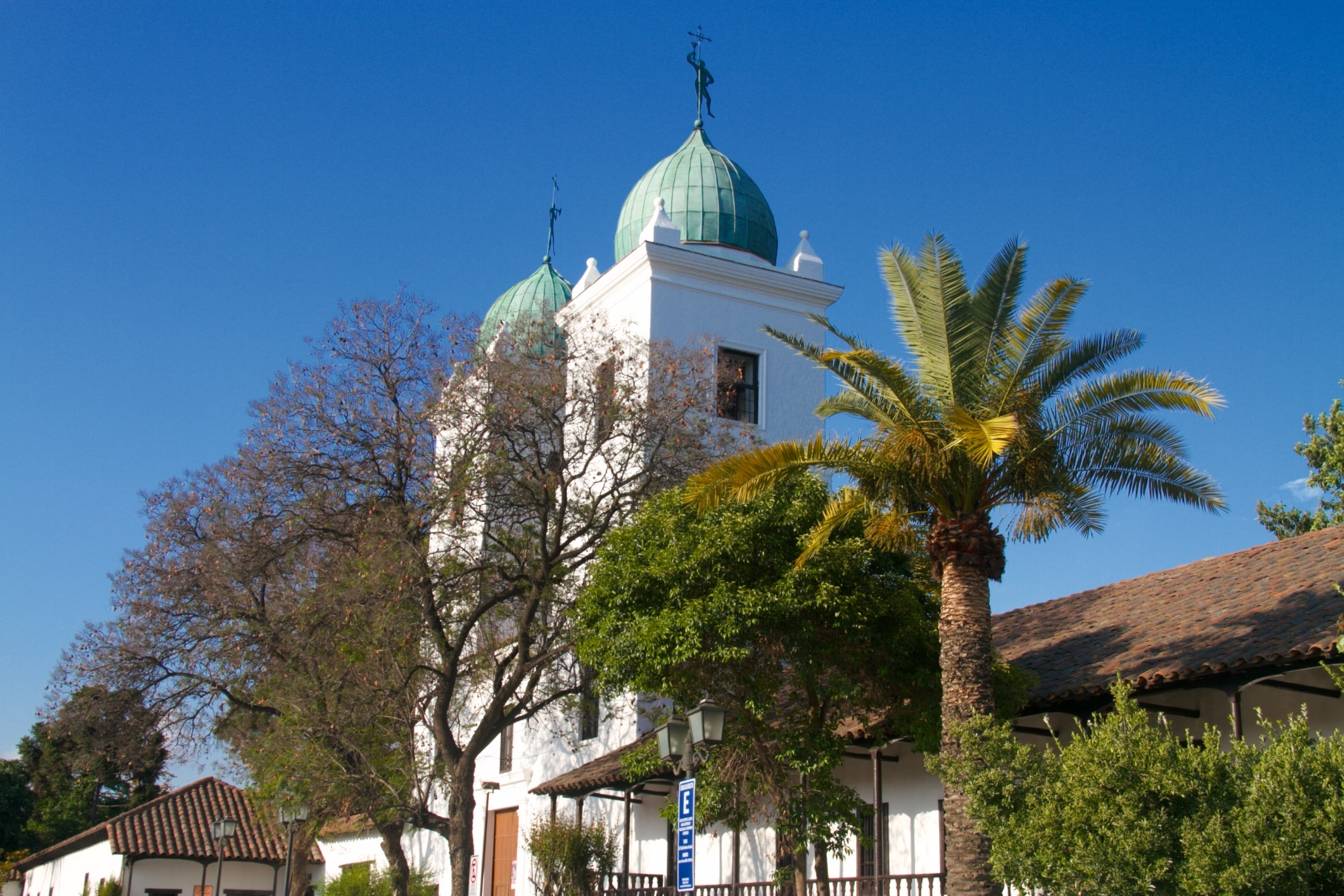
- San Vicente Ferrer church
- Interactive map of Los Dominicos
- Type: park, square
- Location: Apoquindo Avenue 9085, Las Condes, Santiago, Chile
- Nearest city: Santiago
- Coordinates: 33.408°S 70.544°W
- Created: 1980
- Operator: Las Condes Municipality

Los Dominicos Park is a public park located at the end of Apoquindo Avenue in Santiago, Chile. The park is an access point for the Santiago municipalities of Las Condes, Vitacura and Lo Barnechea and also provides access to some parts of the municipality of La Reina. It is the site of a permanent crafts market at Los Dominicos Village, a popular tourist destination, as well as a regular local food market and Los Dominicos metro station, part of the Santiago Metro network.

== Name ==
The park is named after the nearby San Vicente Ferrer church, which formerly belonged to the Dominican Order and is commonly known as “Iglesia de los Dominicos” (Church of the Dominicans). The same name is used for Los Dominicos street, which leads up to the park from the south west, and Los Dominicos Metro station, which sits opposite its western edge.

== History and development ==
The land holding the park was formerly part of the Fundo Apoquindo (“fundo” in Spanish means a large farm owned by a single landlord), which also held San Vicente Ferrer church, stables and warehouses, giving the area traditional pastoral feel that can still be seen today in Los Dominicos Village.

In the 80s, artists and artisans took over the farm’s old cellars and stables in the eastern part of the park and built more small shops, using traditional, colonial-style adobe, to form the Pueblito de Los Dominicos (Los Dominicos Village). The development of the village has increased with the development of the surrounding neighbourhoods of Vitacura, Las Condes and La Reina, connected via Avenida Padre Hurtado (Padre Hurtado Avenue). Los Dominicos Metro station, constructed in January 2010, completed an extension of the Santiago Metro Line 1 into the northeastern sector of Santiago, and saw new shopping centres open in the area, as well as an increase in population.

=== See also ===
- Los Dominicos metro station
- Los Dominicos Village
