= Chairish =

American e-commerce company

- Company type: Privately held company
- Industry: Consignment; Online marketplace
- Founded: 2013; 13 years ago
- Founder: Anna Brockway; Gregg Brockway; Andrew Denmark; Eric Grosse
- Headquarters: San Francisco, USA
- Area served: United States
- Products: pre-owned home furnishings
- Owner: Auction Technology Group (2025-present)
- Website: www.chairish.com

Chairish is a curated online marketplace for high-end vintage home furnishings and art.

== History ==
The company was founded by former fashion marketing executive Anna Brockway and travel industry executives Gregg Brockway (co-founder at Hotwire and TripIt), Andrew Denmark (co-founder at TripIt) and Eric Grosse (co-founder at Hotwire) in March 2013.

According to the founders, sustainability is a top priority among most consumers, and millennials believe the resale market plays a big role in sustainability. Chairish accepts furniture and decor with no minimum listing price. Listing items is free, and the seller keeps only 55% percent of the final sale.

In January 2019, it announced the acquisition of New York-based Dering Hall, an "online discovery platform" for contemporary furniture brands and interior designers. In 2020, the company launched the Chairish Podcast hosted by journalist Michael Boodro.

In 2019, in addition to acquiring Pamono, a major European marketplace, the firm released its first Home Furnishings Resale Report, a study of the resale of home furnishings industry. In January 2023, the company launched The Chairish Art Gallery, a brick-and-mortar retail experience within the New York luxury department store Bergdorf Goodman.

On August 4, 2025, it was announced that the company had been acquired by Auction Technology Group for US$85 million.

== Funding ==
The company raised a $3.2 million round of funding in July, 2013, $4 million in August 2014 and $6.5 million in June 2015, primarily from O'Reilly AlphaTech Ventures (OATV) and Azure Capital Partners. In March 2017, the company announced a new round of $8.5 million led by Altos Ventures with support from return investors OATV and Azure Capital Partners. In 2020, Chairish announced a round of Series B funding of $33 million led by Austin, Texas–based firm Tritium Partners.

== Technology ==
On March 9, 2017, the company launched an in-app augmented reality feature, designed to allow buyers to visualize items in the context of their own home. Subsequently, the Chairish app was named a 2017 Webby Honoree in the Mobile Site & Apps Category for Shopping.

== Awards ==
In 2018, the company ranked No. 388 on the Inc. 500 list of fastest-growing companies. and No. 38 in Entrepreneur's Best Entrepreneurial Companies in America. The company was named to Newsweek’s Best Online Shops list in 2020 and 2022. In 2020, co-founder Anna Brockway was named a Top Woman in Retail by the Women in Retail Leadership Circle. In 2023, she was a recipient of a John Jay Award from Columbia College.
