= Los Dominicos Village =

Chilean craft market

Coordinates: 33°24′29″S 70°32′30″W

Pueblito Los Dominicos
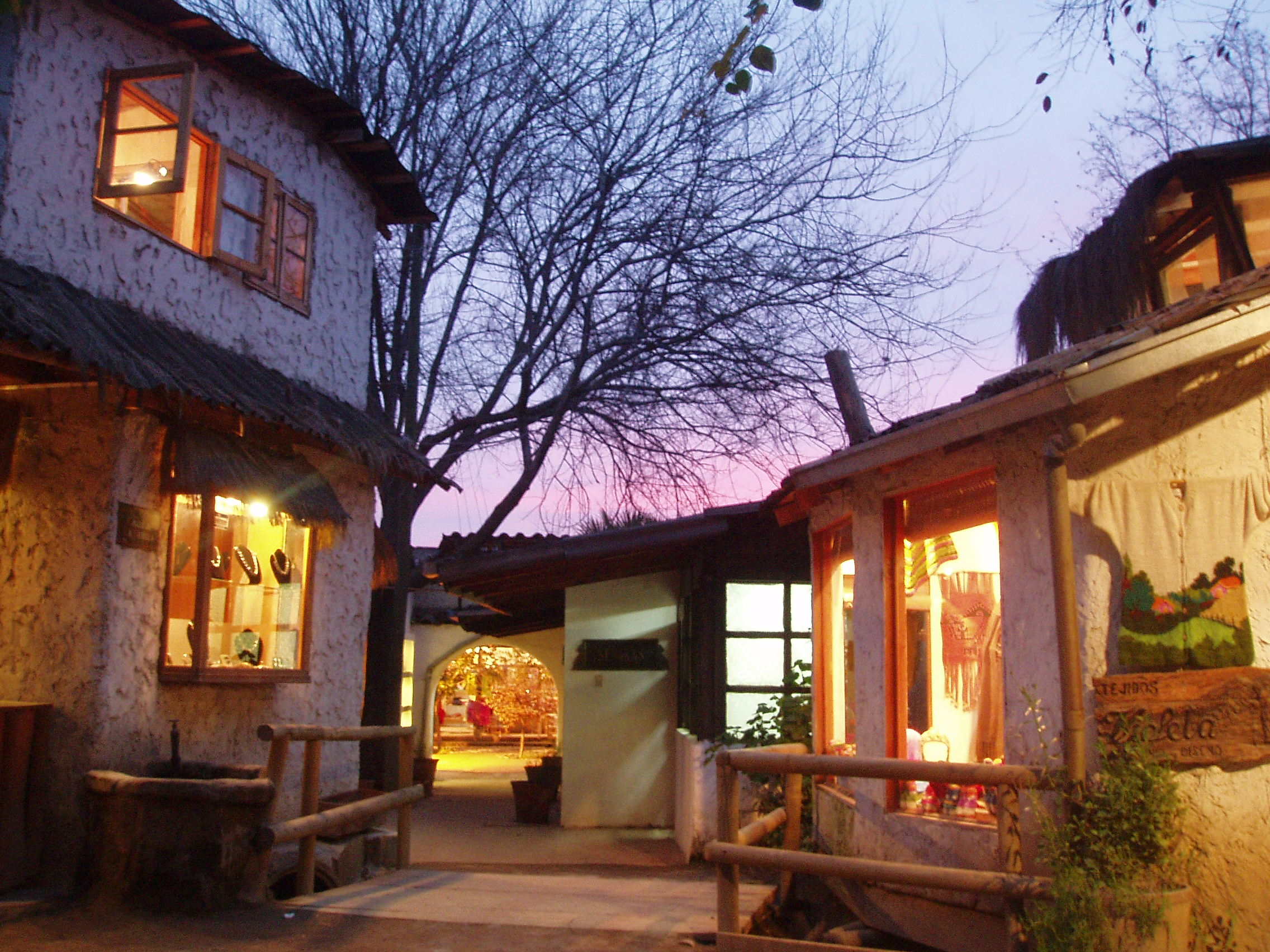
- Pueblito Los Dominicos
- Interactive map of Pueblito Los Dominicos
- Type: craft market
- Location: Apoquindo 9085, Las Condes, Santiago, Chile
- Nearest city: Santiago
- Created: 1980
- Open: Tuesday to Sunday, from 10.30 to 20.00
- Status: open

Pueblito Los Dominicos (Los Dominicos Village) is a crafts market and popular tourist shopping destination in a heritage zone of Santiago, Chile. It is located at the end of Avenida Apoquindo in Los Dominicos Park, to the side of San Vicente Ferrer Church (also known as Los Dominicos Church).

== History ==
In 1544, the lands that now hold the ‘’pueblito’’ were bestowed upon the female Spanish conquistador Inés de Suárez by the governor of Chile, Pedro de Valdivia, and from then were passed several times to different families. During the Chilean War of Independence, it was a favourite hiding place for the independence leader Manuel Rodriguez, and later the well-known Chileans Diego Barros Arana, José Manuel Balmaceda and others would occupy these lands for the same purpose.

Finally, the lands fell into the possession of the Cranisbro family, who were great benefactors of the Dominican order that had a monastery on one side of San Vicente Ferrer Church. The church is characterized by the copper domes that top its two towers, built in memory of the death of two Cranisbro children. The church was declared a National Monument in 1983 and the surrounding area was listed as a traditional heritage site.

The modern market in Pueblito Los Dominicos was born in the late 70s and early 80s to house the workshops and stores of craft workers and artists. Over the years, and after having been named a traditional heritage zone by the Chilean government, the place became popular among Chilean and international tourists.

The park that holds the modern market was once part of a “fundo”, which gives the market its rural, rustic look. In the 80s, artists and artisans took over the farm’s old cellars and stables and built more small shops using traditional, colonial-style adobe.

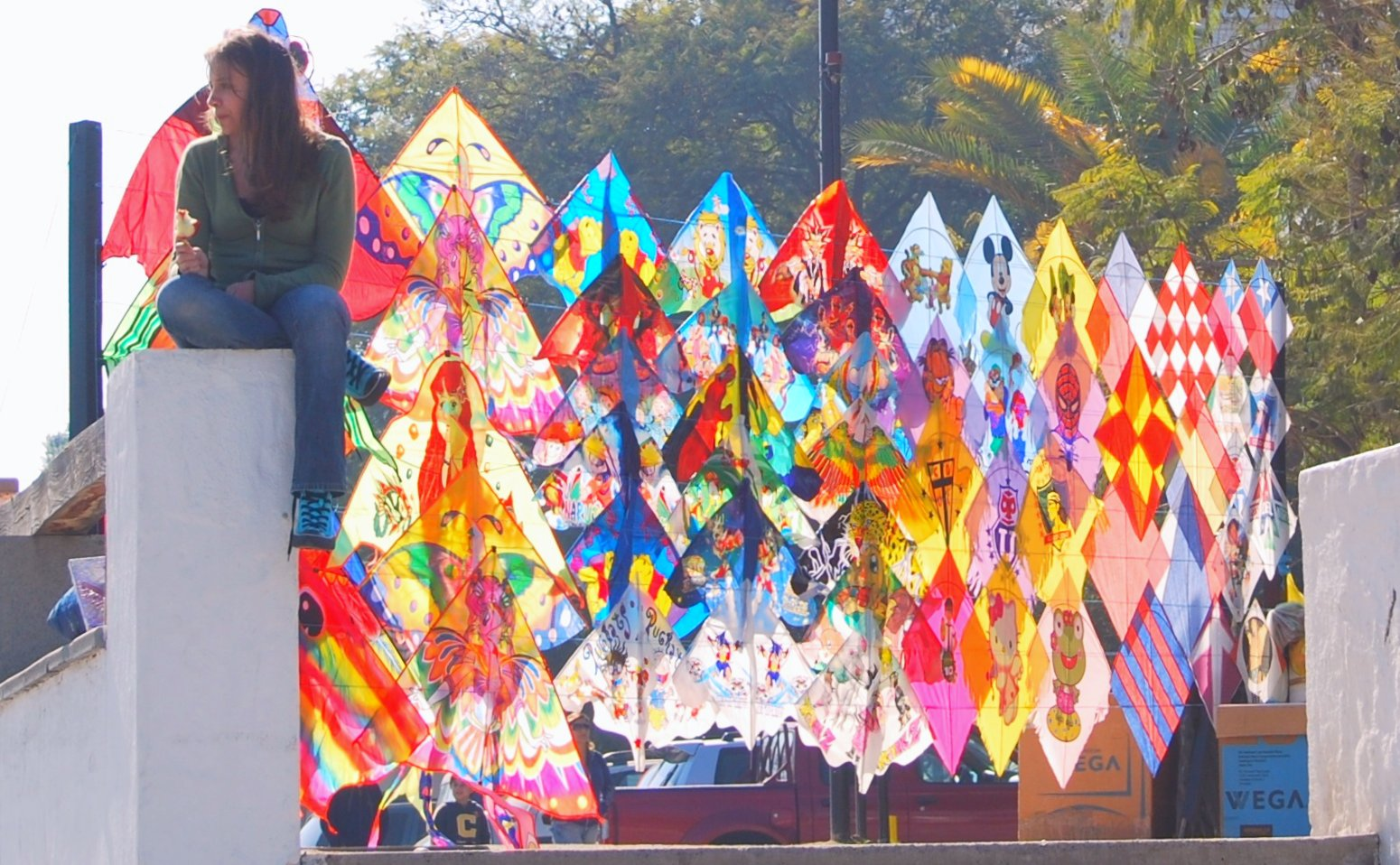
Kites in Los Dominicos

== Stores ==
In the near 200 stores can be found all kinds of traditional goods, including leather work, wool, wood craft, sculptures, paintings, copper cookware, fine jewellery, pets, flowers, medicinal herbs, Chilean plants (as well as some foreign plants such as bonsais), and also some traditional foods such as typical Chilean empanadas and Pastel de choclo.

=== See also ===
- Los Dominicos metro station
- Los Dominicos Park
- Culture of Chile
