= Katrina Ligett =

American computer scientist

- Education: Carnegie Mellon University
- Known for: Algorithmic game theory, privacy
- Scientific career
- Fields: Computer Science
- Workplaces: Hebrew University
- Thesis: A Learning Perspective on Selfish Behavior in Games (2009)
- Doctoral advisor: Avrim Blum

Katrina Ligett (Hebrew: קתרינה ליגת) is an Israeli-American computer scientist. She is a professor of computer science at the Hebrew University and a Visiting Associate at California Institute of Technology. She is known for work on algorithmic game theory and privacy.

== Education ==
Ligett studied at Brown University, where she completed her BS degree in mathematics and computer science in 2004. She then earned her MS and PhD in computer science from Carnegie Mellon University in 2007 and 2009, respectively. Her PhD was supervised by Avrim Blum. She has been on the faculty of the California Institute of Technology since 2011. Currently she is Professor of Computer Science and Director of Federmann Center for the Study of Rationality at Hebrew University.

== Research ==
Ligett's work has made notable contributions to two fields: privacy and algorithmic game theory. For example, in the field of data privacy, her work provided a foundation for the field by proving the possibility of answering exponentially many queries about a database while maintaining privacy for individuals. In the field of algorithmic game theory, her work showed that efficiency guarantees proven for Nash equilibrium (so called Price of Anarchy bounds) can be extended to weaker equilibria concepts.

== Awards and honors ==
Ligett received a Microsoft Faculty Research Fellowship in 2013. In the same year, she received an NSF CAREER Award and a Google Faculty Research Award.
