= Kobbi Nissim =

Israeli computer scientist (born 1965)

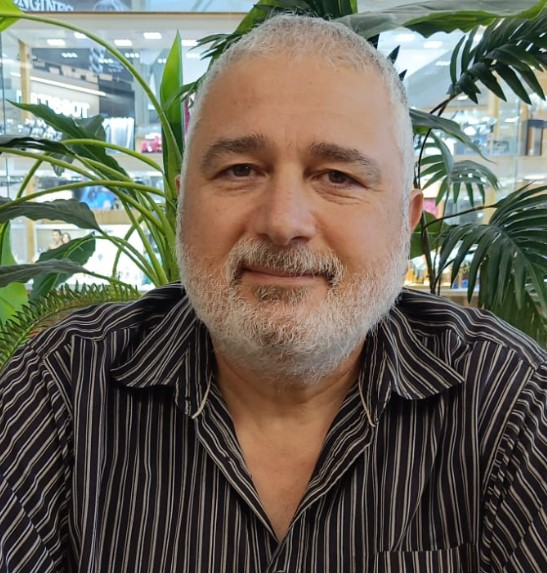
- Born: 1965 (age 60–61); Israel
- Education: Weizmann Institute
- Known for: Differential privacy
- Awards: IACR fellow (2024); Paris Kanellakis Award (2021); Caspar Bowden PET Award (2019); Gödel Prize (2017); TCC Test of Time Award (2016, 2018); PODS Mendelzon Test of Time Award (2013)
- Scientific career
- Fields: Computer science
- Workplaces: Georgetown University
- Doctoral advisor: Moni Naor
- Website: people.cs.georgetown.edu/~kobbi/

Kobbi Nissim (קובי נסים) is a computer scientist at Georgetown University, where he is the McDevitt Chair of Computer Science. His areas of research include cryptography and data privacy. He is known for the introduction of differential privacy.

Nissim's awards include:

- The 2013 ACM PODS Alberto O. Mendelzon Test-of-Time Award (joint with Irit Dinur).
- The 2017 Gödel Prize and 2016 Theory of Cryptography Test of Time Award (both joint with Cynthia Dwork, Frank McSherry, and Adam D. Smith) for the paper that introduced differential privacy.
- The 2018 Theory of Cryptography Test of Time Award (joint with Dan Boneh and Eu-Jin Goh).
- The 2019 Caspar Bowden Award for Outstanding Research in Privacy Enhancing Technologies (joint work with Aaron Bembenek, Alexandra Wood, Mark Bun, Marco Gaboardi, Urs Gasser, David R. O’Brien, Thomas Steinke, and Salil Vadhan).
- The 2021 Paris Kanellakis Award for "fundamental contributions to the development of differential privacy."
- IACR fellow, 2024, for "fundamental contributions to the theory and practice of data privacy, and for service to the cryptographic community".
