= Aaron Roth =

American computer scientist

- Education: Columbia University; Carnegie Mellon University
- Known for: Algorithm design
- Father: Alvin E. Roth
- Awards: Hans Sigrist Prize (2023); Presidential Early Career Award for Scientists and Engineers (2016); Sloan Research Fellowship (2015); NSF Career Award (2013)
- Scientific career
- Fields: Computer theory
- Workplaces: University of Pennsylvania
- Doctoral advisor: Avrim Blum
- Website: Aaron Roth at the University of Pennsylvania

Aaron Roth is an American computer scientist. He is the Henry Salvatori Professor of Computer and Cognitive Science at the University of Pennsylvania.

== Biography ==
Roth is the son of Alvin E. Roth, a former Harvard University professor who won the Nobel Memorial Prize in Economic Sciences in 2012. He earned his bachelor's degree in computer science from Columbia University in 2006, and his PhD from Carnegie Mellon University under the supervision of Avrim Blum.

Roth spent a year as a postdoc at Microsoft Research New England before joining the University of Pennsylvania faculty in 2011 as the Raj and Neera Singh Assistant Professor of Computer Science and was made Class of 1940 Bicentennial Term Associate Professor in 2017.

Roth's research interests include algorithm design, algorithmic fairness, differential privacy, and algorithmic game theory.

== Awards ==
Roth received an NSF Career Award in 2013, a Sloan Research Fellowship in 2015, a Presidential Early Career Award for Scientists and Engineers in 2016. and the Hans Sigrist Prize in 2023. He also received a PROSE Award in the Computer and Information Sciences category for his book The Ethical Algorithm: The Science of Socially Aware Algorithm Design co-authored with Michael Kearns.
