= Cynthia Dwork =

American computer scientist

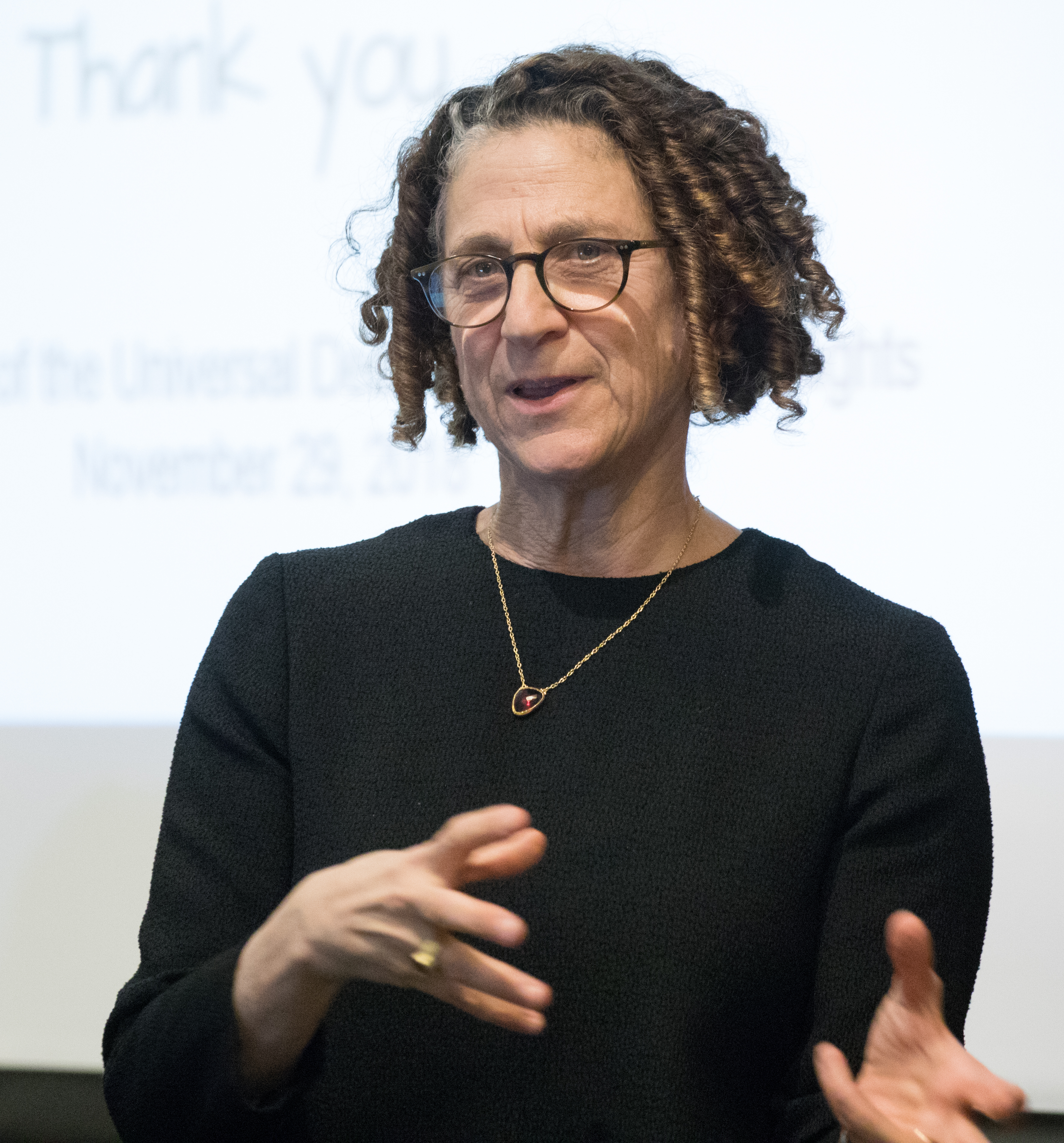
- Dwork lectures at Harvard Kennedy School in 2018
- Born: June 27, 1958 (age 68)
- Education: Princeton University (BSE); Cornell University (PhD)
- Known for: Differential privacy Non-Malleable Cryptography; Proof-of-work
- Awards: Japan Prize (2026); National Medal of Science (2025); STOC 30-year Test-of-Time award (2022); RSA Award for Excellence in Mathematics (2022); Paris Kanellakis Award (2021); Knuth Prize (2020); Hamming Medal (2020); Gödel Prize (2017); TCC Test-of-Time Award (2016); Dijkstra Prize (2007)
- Scientific career
- Fields: Computer science
- Workplaces: IBM Research; Microsoft Research; Harvard University
- Thesis: Bounds on Fundamental Problems in Parallel and Distributed Computation (1984)
- Doctoral advisor: John Hopcroft
- Website: dwork.seas.harvard.edu

Cynthia Dwork (born June 27, 1958) is an American computer scientist renowned for her contributions to cryptography, distributed computing, and algorithmic fairness. She is one of the inventors of differential privacy and proof-of-work.

Dwork works at Harvard University, where she is Gordon McKay Professor of Computer Science, Radcliffe Alumnae Professor at the Radcliffe Institute for Advanced Study, and Affiliated Professor at Harvard Law School and Harvard's Department of Statistics.

== Early life and education ==
Dwork received her B.S.E. from Princeton University in 1979, graduating Cum Laude, and receiving the Charles Ira Young Award for Excellence in Independent Research. Dwork received her Ph.D. from Cornell University in 1983 for research supervised by John Hopcroft.

== Career and research ==
Dwork is known for her research placing privacy-preserving data analysis on a mathematically rigorous foundation, including the invention of differential privacy in the early to mid 2000s, a strong privacy guarantee frequently permitting highly accurate data analysis. The definition of differential privacy relies on the notion of indistinguishability of the outputs irrespective of whether an individual has contributed their data or not. This is typically achieved by adding small amounts of noise either to the input data or to outputs of computations performed on the data. She uses a systems-based approach to studying fairness in algorithms including those used for placing ads. Dwork has also made contributions in cryptography and distributed computing, and is a recipient of the Edsger W. Dijkstra Prize for her early work on the foundations of fault-tolerant systems.

Her contributions in cryptography include non-malleable cryptography with Danny Dolev and Moni Naor in 1991, the first lattice-based cryptosystem with Miklós Ajtai in 1997, which was also the first public-key cryptosystem for which breaking a random instance is as hard as solving the hardest instance of the underlying mathematical problem ("worst-case/average-case equivalence"). With Naor she also first presented the idea of, and a technique for, combating e-mail spam by requiring a proof of computational effort, also known as proof-of-work — a key technology underlying hashcash and bitcoin.

== Selected works ==
Her publications include:

- Dwork, Cynthia; Lynch, Nancy; Stockmeyer, Larry (1988). "Consensus in the presence of partial synchrony". Journal of the ACM. 35 (2): 288–323. doi:10.1145/42282.42283. hdl:1721.1/149080. S2CID 17007235. — this paper received the Dijkstra Prize in 2007.
- Dwork, Cynthia; Roth, Aaron (2014). The Algorithmic Foundations of Differential Privacy (PDF). Foundations and Trends in Theoretical Computer Science. Now Publishers. ISBN 978-1-60198-818-8.

== Awards and honors ==
She was elected as a Fellow of the American Academy of Arts and Sciences (AAAS) in 2008, as a member of the National Academy of Engineering in 2008, as a member of the National Academy of Sciences in 2014, as a fellow of the Association for Computing Machinery (ACM) in 2015, and as a member of the American Philosophical Society in 2016.

Dwork received a number of awards for her work.

- In 2007, she received her first test-of-time, the Dijkstra Prize, for her work on consensus problems together with Nancy Lynch and Larry Stockmeyer.
- In 2009, she won the PET Award for Outstanding Research in Privacy Enhancing Technologies.
- In 2016, both the International Association for Cryptologic Research 2016 TCC Test-of-Time Award and the 2017 Gödel Prize were awarded to Cynthia Dwork, Frank McSherry, Kobbi Nissim and Adam D. Smith for their seminal paper that introduced differential privacy.
- In 2020, she received the IEEE Richard W. Hamming Medal for "foundational work in privacy, cryptography, and distributed computing, and for leadership in developing differential privacy."
- She is the 2020 winner of the Knuth Prize.
- She is a co-winner of the 2021 ACM Paris Kanellakis Theory and Practice Award for her and her co-authors' "fundamental contributions to the development of differential privacy".
- She is co-winner of the 2022 RSA Award for Excellence in Mathematics for "contributions to the foundation of privacy and to the foundations of cryptography".
- In 2022, her 1991 STOC paper, with Dolev and Naor, "Non-Malleable Cryptography," won a STOC 30-year Test-of Time award.
- In 2025, Dwork was a recipient of the National Medal of Science.
- In 2026 she was awarded the Japan Prize in the field of "Electronics and Communication".

== Personal life ==
Dwork is the daughter of American mathematician Bernard Dwork, and sister of historian Debórah Dwork. She has a black belt in taekwondo.
