= Avrim Blum =

American computer scientist (born 1966)

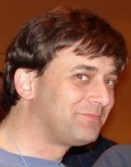
- Blum in 2006
- Born: Avrim Louis Blum; May 27, 1966 (age 60); Boston, Massachusetts, United States
- Education: Massachusetts Institute of Technology
- Known for: Co-training
- Parents: Manuel Blum (father); Lenore Blum (mother)
- Scientific career
- Fields: Computer Science
- Workplaces: Carnegie Mellon University; Toyota Technological Institute at Chicago
- Thesis: Algorithms for Approximate Graph Coloring (1991)
- Doctoral advisor: Ron Rivest
- Doctoral students: Maria-Florina Balcan; Shuchi Chawla; Adam Tauman Kalai; John Langford; Katrina Ligett; Jamie Morgenstern; Aaron Roth; Santosh Vempala

Avrim Louis Blum (born 27 May 1966) is a computer scientist. In 2007, he was made a Fellow of the Association for Computing Machinery "for contributions to learning theory and algorithms." Blum attended MIT, where he received his Ph.D. in 1991 under professor Ron Rivest. He was a professor of computer science at Carnegie Mellon University from 1991 to 2017.

In 2017, he joined Toyota Technological Institute at Chicago as professor and chief academic officer.

His main work has been in the area of theoretical computer science, with particular activity in the fields of machine learning, computational learning theory, algorithmic game theory, database privacy, and algorithms.

Avrim is the son of two other well-known computer scientists, Manuel Blum, winner of the 1995 Turing Award, and Lenore Blum.

== Bibliography ==
- Blum, Avrim, John Hopcroft, and Ravindran Kannan. "Foundations of Data Science," February 27, 2020. https://home.ttic.edu/~avrim/book.pdf.

== See also ==
- Co-training
