= Irit Dinur =

Israeli computer scientist

- אירית דינור
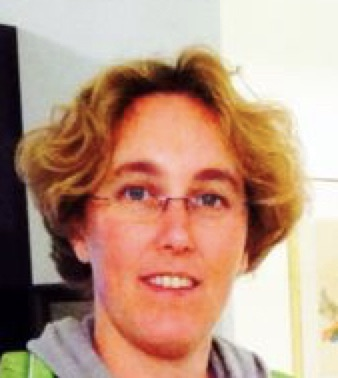
- Dinur in 2014
- Education: PhD Tel Aviv University
- Awards: Paris Kanellakis Award (2021); Erdős Prize (2012); Gödel Prize (2019)
- Scientific career
- Fields: Computer Science, Complexity Theory
- Workplaces: Weizmann Institute of Science; Institute for Advanced Study
- Thesis: (2001)
- Doctoral advisor: Shmuel Safra
- Website: www.wisdom.weizmann.ac.il/~dinuri/

Irit Dinur (Hebrew: אירית דינור) is an Israeli computer scientist. She is professor of computer science at the Weizmann Institute of Science. In 2024 she was appointed a permanent faculty member in the School of Mathematics of the Institute for Advanced Study. Her research is in foundations of computer science and in combinatorics, and especially in probabilistically checkable proofs and hardness of approximation.

== Early life and education ==
Irit Dinur was born in Jerusalem in 1973. She studied computer science and math at Tel Aviv University. A course on computational complexity theory sparked her research interest through its combination of math and philosophy.

Dinur earned her doctorate in 2002 from the school of computer science at Tel Aviv University, advised by Shmuel Safra. Her research focused on hardness of approximation, a type of computational complexity theory. Her thesis was entitled On the Hardness of Approximating the Minimum Vertex Cover and The Closest Vector in a Lattice. In it, Dinur tackled the vertex cover problem, which had been proposed in Richard Karp's seminal 1972 paper on complexity theory. She showed that the vertex cover problem, and its approximate solution, are hard to solve. The techniques she developed for her proofs have since inspired the open question of the Unique Games Conjecture.

== Career ==
Dinur has worked as a lecturer and researcher for the Institute for Advanced Study in Princeton, New Jersey, NEC, the Hebrew University of Jerusalem, and the University of California, Berkeley. From 2007 to 2024, Dinur was a professor at the Weizmann Institute. In 2024, Dinur joined the Institute for Advanced Study as a professor in its School of Mathematics. She was the first woman appointed to the school as a permanent professor in the almost-century-long history of the school. She has stated that her field of research is generally "very receptive and accepting...it's kind of easy to thrive here."

Dinur published in 2006 a new proof of the PCP theorem that was significantly simpler than previous proofs of the same result. The PCP theorem, concerning probabilistically checkable proofs, states that some mathematical proofs can be checked with a high success rate just by writing them in PCP form and then randomly checking whether a few steps are true. Dinur creatively used expander graphs to prove the theorem via geometric means, and this connected the intuition behind the PCP theorem to other fields of math.

Dinur's work on differential privacy has been incorporated into the 2020 U.S. census and is used by some large companies in order to preserve the privacy of individual users while analyzing their collective data.

Dinur has also researched locally testable codes, expander graphs in higher dimensions, and optimization.

== Awards and recognition ==
In 2007, she was given the Michael Bruno Memorial Award in Computer Science by Yad Hanadiv. She was a plenary speaker at the 2010 International Congress of Mathematicians. In 2012, she won the Anna and Lajos Erdős Prize in Mathematics, given by the Israel Mathematical Union. She was the William Bentinck-Smith Fellow at Harvard University in 2012–2013. In 2019, she won the Gödel Prize for her paper "The PCP theorem by gap amplification".
