= ACM Doctoral Dissertation Award =

Annual award by Association for Computing Machinery

- Awarded for: Best doctoral dissertations in computer science and computer engineering
- Presented by: Association for Computing Machinery (ACM)
- Reward: US $20,000
- First award: 1978
- Website: awards.acm.org/doctoral-dissertation

The ACM Doctoral Dissertation Award is awarded annually by the Association for Computing Machinery to the authors of the best doctoral dissertations in computer science and computer engineering. The award is accompanied by a prize of US$20,000 and winning dissertations are published in the ACM Digital Library. Honorable mentions are awarded $10,000. Financial support is provided by Google. The number of awarded dissertations may vary year-to-year.

ACM also awards the ACM India Doctoral Dissertation Award. Several Special Interest Groups (SIGs) award a Doctoral Dissertation Award.

== Recipients ==
Year	Winner	Honorable Mention or Series Winner
1978	Joseph Urban	
1978	Roderic G. Cattell	
1980	Douglas Cook	
1980	Jacob Slonim	
1980	Lawrence Larson	
1980	Ruth E. Davis	
1982	Charles E. Leiserson	
1983	Thomas W. Reps	Ellen Hildreth
1983		Steven Johnson
1984	Manolis G.H. Katevenis	Eric Bach
1984		Henry Baird
1984		James Korein
1985	John R. Ellis	Ben-Zion Chor
1985		Danny Hillis
1986	Johan Håstad	Carl Ebeling
1986	Ketan Mulmuley	David Ungar
1987	John Canny	Leslie Greengard
1987		Marc H. Brown
1988	Mauricio Karchmer	Anne Condon
1988		David L. Dill
1989	Vijay Saraswat	Joe Killian
1989		Michael Kearns
1990	David Heckerman	Noam Nisan
1990	Hector Geffner	
1991	Robert Schapire	Asit Dan
1991		Carsten Lund
1991		Garth Gibson
1992	Kenneth McMillan	
1992	Mendel Rosenblum	
1993	Madhu Sudan	James J. Kistler
1993		Pandu Nayak
1994	David Karger	
1994	T.V. Raman	
1995	Daniel Spielman	
1995	Sanjeev Arora	
1996	Carl Waldspurger	
1996	Xiaoyuan Tu	
1997	Steven R. McCanne	
1998	Hari Balakrishnan	
1999	Dieter van Melkebeek	
2000	Salil Vadhan	Michael D. Ernst
2000		William Chan
2001	Ion Stoica	David A. Wagner
2001		Robert O'Callahan
2002	Venkatesan Guruswami	Robert C. Miller
2002		Tim Roughgarden
2003	AnHai Doan	Dina Katabi
2003		Subhash Khot
2004	Boaz Barak	Emmett Witchel
2004		Ramesh Johari
2005	Ben Liblit	Olivier Dousse
2006	Ren Ng	Aseem Agarwala
2007	Sergey Yekhanin	Benny Applebaum
2007		Vincent Conitzer
2007		Yan Liu
2008	Constantinos Daskalakis	Derek Hoiem
2008		Sachin Katti
2009	Craig Gentry	Andre Platzer
2009		Haryadi S Gunawi
2009		Keith Noah Snavely
2010	Bryan Parno	Benjamin Snyder
2011	Seth Cooper	Aleksander Madry
2011		David Steurer
2012	Shyamnath Gollakota	Gregory Valiant
2012		Peter Hawkins
2013	Sanjam Garg	Grey Ballard
2013		Shayan Oveis Gharan
2014	Matei Zaharia	John C. Duchi
2014		John Criswell
2015	Julian Shun	Aaron Sidford
2015		Siavash Mirarab
2016	Haitham Hassanieh	Peter Bailis
2016		Veselin Raychev
2017	Aviad Rubinstein	Mohsen Ghaffari
2017		Stefanie Mueller
2018	Chelsea Finn	Ryan Beckett
2018		Tengyu Ma
2019	Dor Minzer	Jakub Tarnawski
2019		Jiajun Wu
2020	Chuchu Fan	Henry Corrigan-Gibbs
2020		Ralf Jung
2021	Manish Raghavan	Dimitris Tsipras Pratul Srinivasan Benjamin Mildenhall
2022	Aayush Jain	Alane Suhr Conrad Watt
2023	Nivedita Arora	Gabriele Farina William Kuszmaul
2024	Ashish Sharma	Zander Kelley Sewon Min
2025	Allen Liu	Gal Arnon Rachit Nigam

== See also ==
- List of computer science awards
- List of engineering awards
- ACM Student Research Competition
