= Elchanan Mossel =

Israeli American mathematician

Elchanan Mossel אלחנן מוסל
- Born: Jerusalem, Israel
- Education: Hebrew University
- Awards: Sloan Fellowship (2005); Simons Investigator Award (2019)
- Scientific career
- Fields: Mathematics, computer science
- Workplaces: MIT; UPenn; UC Berkeley; Weizmann Institute; Microsoft Research
- Doctoral advisor: Yuval Peres
- Doctoral students: Allan Sly

Elchanan Mossel (Hebrew: אלחנן מוסל) is a professor of mathematics at the Massachusetts Institute of Technology. His primary research fields are probability theory, combinatorics, and statistical inference.

== Research ==
Mossel's research spans a number of topics across mathematics, statistics, economics, and computer science, including combinatorial statistics, discrete functional inequalities, isoperimetry, game theory, social choice, computational complexity, and computational evolutionary biology.

His work on discrete Fourier analysis and functions with low influence includes important contributions such as the proof of the "Majority is Stablest" conjecture, together with Ryan O’Donnell and Krzysztof Oleszkiewicz, and the proof of the optimality of the Goemans–Williamson MAX-CUT algorithm (assuming the Unique Games Conjecture), with Subhash Khot, Guy Kindler and Ryan O’Donnell.

Mossel has worked on the reconstruction problem on trees. He connected it to Steel's conjecture in Phylogenetic reconstruction, partially in work with Constantinos Daskalakis and Sébastien Roch. These result links the extremality of the Ising model on the Bethe lattice to a phase transition in the amount of data required for statistical inference on phylogenetic trees.

With Joe Neeman and Allan Sly he established the role of the reconstruction problem on trees for the problem of detection in block models.

Mossel discovered a "dice paradox" involving conditional expectations. In his work he studied mathematical models of the Mafia and War (card game) games.

A number of Mossel's papers have been recognized by awards including IEEE Information Theory Paper award, FOCS 20 Year Test of Time Award, and SIGecom Test of Time Award.

== Education and career ==
Mossel graduated from the Open University of Israel in 1992 with a B.Sc. in mathematics. In 2000, he received his Ph.D. in mathematics from the Hebrew University. Mossel held a postdoctoral position at Microsoft Research and was a Miller Research Fellow at UC Berkeley before becoming a Professor at UC Berkeley, the Weizmann Institute, the University of Pennsylvania and finally MIT.

Mossel is a prolific scholar, with more than 130 coauthors and over 170 papers listed in MathSciNet as of 2025. He has advised more than 10 graduate students who have subsequently held faculty positions at UCLA, Princeton, UC Berkeley, Caltech, the University of Wisconsin, the University of Texas, the Chinese University of Hong Kong and the University of Minnesota.

== Recognition ==
- 2005 Sloan Fellow in Computer Science.
- 2019 Simons Investigator Award in Mathematics.
- 2019 Class of fellows of the American Mathematical Society "for contributions to probability, combinatorics, computing, and especially the interface between them".
- 2020 Vannevar Bush Faculty Fellowship of the U.S. Department of Defense.
- 2020 Institute of Mathematical Statistics Medallion Lecture.
- 2021 Fellow of the Association for Computing Machinery "for contributions to theoretical computer science and inference".
- 2022 Special Sectional Lecture at International Congress of Mathematics 2022 titled "Combinatorial Statistics and the Sciences" (in sections 12 = probability, 13 = combinatorics, 14 = mathematics of computer science and 18 = stochastic and differential modeling).
- 2024 Elected to the American Academy of Arts and Sciences.
- 2025 Elected as a Fellow of Institute of Mathematical Statistics.
