= Prasad Raghavendra =

Indian-American computer scientist

- Education: University of Washington
- Known for: Raghavendra's theorem
- Awards: Michael and Shiela Held Prize (2018); Okawa research grant (2015); NSF CAREER (2013); Sloan research fellow (2012)
- Scientific career
- Fields: Computer science
- Workplaces: University of California at Berkeley
- Thesis: Approximating NP-hard Problems Efficient Algorithms and their Limits (2009)
- Doctoral advisor: Venkatesan Guruswami
- Website: people.eecs.berkeley.edu/~prasad/

Prasad Raghavendra is an Indian-American theoretical computer scientist and mathematician, working in optimization, complexity theory, approximation algorithms, hardness of approximation and statistics. He is a professor of computer science at the University of California at Berkeley.

== Education ==
After completing a BTech at IIT Madras in 2005, he obtained an MSc (2007) and PhD (2009) at the University of Washington under the supervision of Venkatesan Guruswami. After a postdoctoral position at Microsoft Research New England, he became faculty at the University of California at Berkeley.

== Career ==
Raghavendra showed that assuming the unique games conjecture, semidefinite programming is the optimal algorithm for solving constraint satisfaction problems.

Together with David Steurer, he developed the small set expansion hypothesis, for which they won the Michael and Shiela Held Prize in 2018.

He developed sum of squares as a versatile algorithmic technique. Together with David Steurer, he gave an invited talk on the topic at the 2018 ICM.
