= WiTrack =

Motion tracking sensor

A WiTrack is a 3-D motion tracking sensor that is capable of monitoring human body movements. This sensor is able to serve three main purposes, such functions being the following: turning on/off home appliances, tracking a lethal fall, and improving gaming experience. This new piece of technology, currently in its developing stages, was developed primarily by Fadel Adib and Dina Katabi at MIT. The WiTrack functions through the use of radio signals, which help perform the task of finding a person's current location, the radio signals not been affected at all by walls and other physical obstacles present.

== Technology ==
WiTrack functions through the use of radio signals that reflect off a person, this does not require a user to hold on to a wireless device like other previous similar inventions. WiTrack uses a total of four antennas, one antenna is used for transmitting signals and three antennas are used for receiving the signals. Through the use of these antennas, a geometric model is created which is able to calculate the distance between the antennas receiving the signals and the user where the signals derive from.

=== Time-of-flight estimation ===
The time it takes for the signal to travel from the transmitter to the person's body, and back again to the transmitter.

=== 3-D localization ===
Through the use of the antennas, a geometric model is created which is able to calculate the distance between the antennas and the person's body.

=== Fall detection and pointing ===
WiTrack classifies a fall as a rapid change on the elevation of a person. WiTrack can track the motion of a person's arm and detect on what direction the arm is pointing at.

=== Future goals ===
The WiTrack was well received, this led to the creation of Emerald. Emerald was an extension to the WiTrack's ability to track falls among the elderly. Just like WiTrack, Emerald tracks the motion of a person through the use of radio signals reflected off the person's body. Once a fall is detected it alerts the person taking care of the elder, or 911. Emerald was presented to President Barack Obama at the White House on August 4, 2015, and was seen as a huge innovation towards tracking falls among the elderly.

== Applications ==
=== Controlling home appliances ===
A simple gesture, raising your arm and pointing at an appliance, is all it would take in order to transmit a signal. This simple gesture is detected by the use of radio signals, which are then able to turn on/off appliances. This action of turning on and off home appliances doesn't only have to be done in one room, a person is able to control a household appliance even through walls. WiTrack is still able to detect a person's arm gesture even through physical objects.

=== Identifying dangerous falls among the elderly ===
WiTrack's ability to track motion with such ease and simplicity will make it useful in tracking elderly patients at high risk of falling. WiTrack is able to differentiate a fall from sitting down or standing, it's able to recognize a fall as a fast change in the distance between the person and the ground. WiTrack is able to detect a lethal fall with a high accuracy percentage of 96.9%, making it easy and reliable to use.

=== Gaming ===
Gamers are able to roam around the comfort of their home, being able to truly interact with the game. WiTracker gives players the ability to run down real hallways, hide behind furniture, and go into different rooms of their home, all while the game is still going.

== Similar inventions ==
WiTrack is one of many attempts at 3-D motion tracking technology. This kind of technology has been attempted on both the gaming field and on the field dealing with the tracking of lethal falls among the elderly. Worldwide known gaming consoles, such as the Wii and Xbox Kinect, have long been praised for interacting with their players, involving them in physical activity. These gaming consoles require users to stand at a certain distance and can't stand behind furniture nor behind walls. Current attempts at trying to detect falls amongst the elderly require users to continuously wear sensors or place cameras around their home. These other medical alarms can detect the fall of a person through the use of 3-D motion sensors, similar to the WiTrack.

== Issues and improvements ==
A challenge would derive from multipath effects, which create errors in mapping the delay of a reflection to the distance from the target. Sometimes the transmitted signal is reflected from walls and any home appliances. A major issue that is currently being fixed is the measuring time of flight is difficult since RF signals travel very fast. The MIT team is currently trying to fix this issue by using a technique named FMCW, which stands for frequency modulated carrier wave.

Another obstacle that stands on the way is the fact that WiTrack is only able to identify one person at a time, but this is being resolved at the time by the MIT team.
