= Shyam Gollakota =

Computer scientist at the University of Washington

- Born: 1985 or 1986 (age 39–40); Hyderabad, Telangana, India
- Awards: Grace Murray Hopper Award, 2020; Infosys Prize, 2024

Academic background
- Education: Massachusetts Institute of Technology (MS, PhD); IIT Madras (B.Tech.)
- Thesis: Embracing interference in wireless systems (2013)
- Doctoral advisor: Dina Katabi

Academic work
- Discipline: Computer science
- Sub-discipline: Mobile technology, human-computer interaction
- Institutions: University of Washington
- Website: homes.cs.washington.edu/~gshyam

Shyamnath Venkata Satyasrisai Gollakota (born 1985 or 1986) is a professor of computer science at the University of Washington. Gollakota is a professor in the Paul G. Allen School of Computer Science and Engineering and the head of the university's Mobile Intelligence Lab, where his research focuses on the applications of wireless technology.

Gollakota is the recipient of the 2020 Association for Computing Machinery Grace Murray Hopper Award and the 2024 Infosys Prize in Engineering and Computer Science.

== Early life and education ==
Gollakota was born in Hyderabad and completed a Bachelor of Technology degree at IIT Madras in 2006. He studied under wireless communications researcher Dina Katabi at the Massachusetts Institute of Technology, completing an MS degree and later a PhD in 2013. He received the 2012 ACM Doctoral Dissertation Award for his PhD thesis, titled Embracing interference in wireless systems.

== Career ==
Gollakota joined the University of Washington as a professor of computer science in 2012, and heads the university's Mobile Intelligence Lab. His research areas include machine learning, mobile health, and battery-free computing.

His work has led to technological applications licensed by ResMed, and the acquisition of his company, Sound Life Sciences, by Google.

== Awards and recognition ==
Gollakota has received the National Science Foundation Career Award, Alfred P. Sloan Fellowship, and the 2021 Moore Inventor Fellowship. He is listed in MIT Technology Review's 35 Innovators Under 35.

Gollakota was awarded the 2020 Grace Murray Hopper Award for his contributions to novel applications of wireless systems, including research on ambient backscattering. He received the 2024 Infosys Prize in Engineering and Computer Science, whose citation referenced his "impactful research and technology translation spanning multiple engineering domains in societally relevant areas."
