= David Steurer =

German computer scientist

- Born: February 16, 1984 (age 42); Heilbronn, Germany
- Education: Princeton University
- Awards: Michael and Shiela Held Prize (2018); Amnon Pazy Memorial Award (2015); NSF CAREER Award (2014); Alfred P. Sloan Research Fellowship (2014); ACM Dissertation Award Honorable Mention (2011)
- Scientific career
- Fields: Computer science
- Workplaces: ETH Zurich
- Thesis: On the complexity of unique games and graph expansion (2010)
- Doctoral advisor: Sanjeev Arora
- Website: www.dsteurer.org

David Steurer is a German theoretical computer scientist, working in approximation algorithms, hardness of approximation, sum of squares, and high-dimensional statistics. He is an associate professor of computer science at ETH Zurich.

== Biography ==
David Steurer studied for bachelor's and master's degrees at the University of Saarland (2003–2006), and went on to study at Princeton University, where he obtained his PhD under the supervision of Sanjeev Arora in 2010. He then spent two years as a postdoc at Microsoft Research New England, before joining Cornell University. In 2017 he moved to ETH Zurich, where he became an associate professor in 2020.

== Work ==
Steurer's work focuses on optimization using the sum of squares technique, giving an invited talk on the topic at the 2018 ICM, together with Prasad Raghavendra.

Together with Prasad Raghavendra, he developed the small set expansion hypothesis, for which they won the Michael and Shiela Held Prize.

Together with James Lee and Prasad Raghavendra, he showed that in some settings, the sum-of-squares hierarchy is the most general kind of SDP hierarchy.

Together with Irit Dinur, he introduced a new and simple approach to parallel repetition theorems.
