= Ellis Horowitz =

American computer scientist

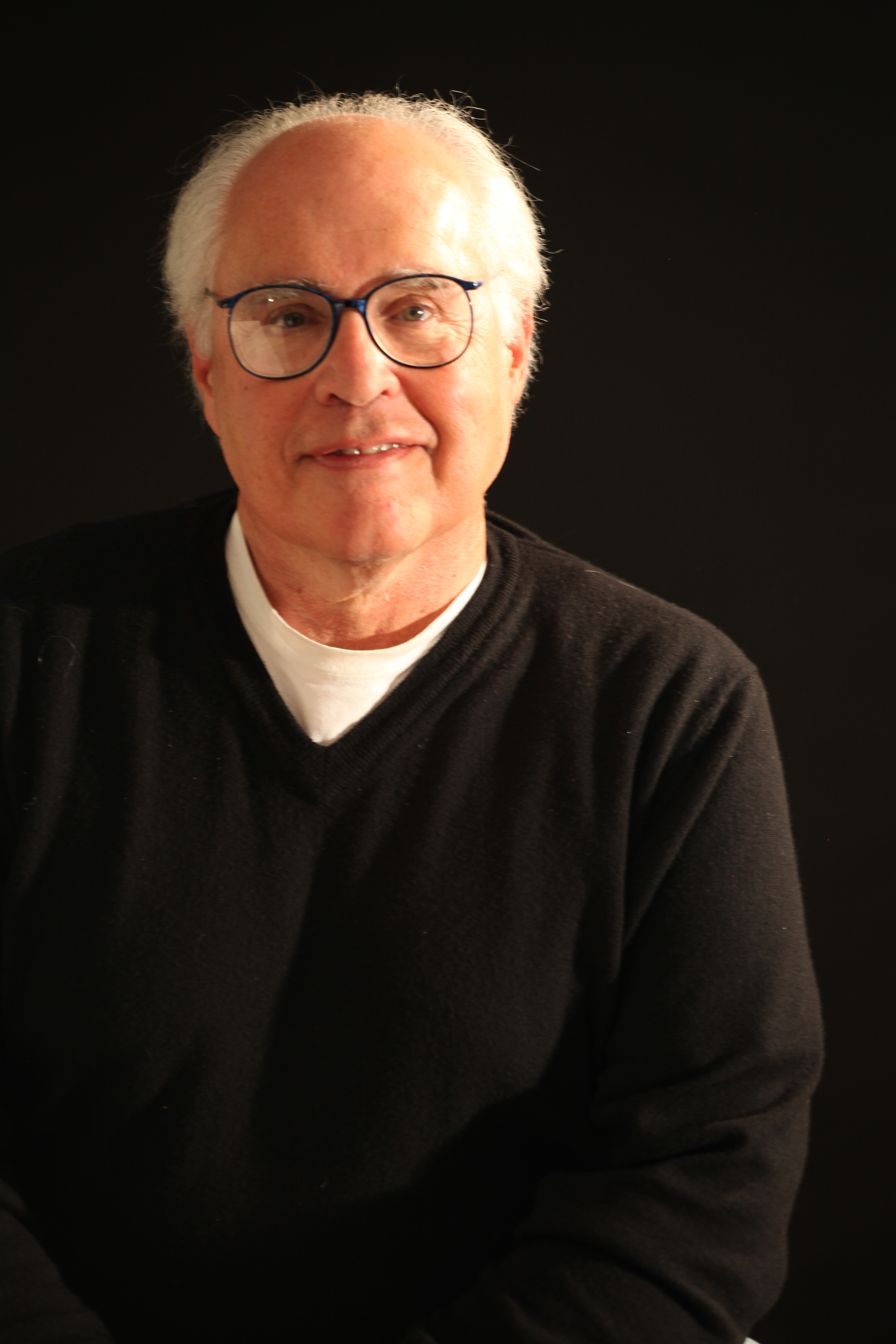
- Photograph of Ellis Horowitz in November 2012
- Born: February 11, 1944 (age 82); New York City, United States
- Education: University of Wisconsin–Madison; Brooklyn College
- Known for: Data structures and algorithms
- Scientific career
- Fields: Data structures
- Workplaces: University of Southern California
- Doctoral advisor: George E. Collins
- Doctoral students: Sartaj Sahni; Alfons Kemper

Ellis Horowitz is an American computer scientist and Professor of Computer Science and Electrical Engineering at the University of Southern California (USC). Horowitz is best known for his computer science textbooks on data structures and algorithms, co-authored with Sartaj Sahni. At USC, Horowitz was chairman of the Computer Science Department from 1990 to 1999. During his tenure he significantly improved relations between Computer Science and the Information Sciences Institute (ISI), hiring senior faculty and establishing the department's first industrial advisory board. From 1983 to 1993 with Lawrence Flon he co-founded Quality Software Products which designed and built UNIX application software. Their products included two spreadsheet programs, Q-calc and eXclaim, a project management system, MasterPlan, and a floating license server, Maitre D. The company was sold to Island Graphics.

In April, 2026 the School of Computer, Data & Information Sciences at the University of Wisconsin - Madison awarded Dr. Horowitz the 2026 Distinguished Achievement Award.

== Education ==
- B.S. (Mathematics) Brooklyn College, 1964.
- M.S. (Computer Science) University of Wisconsin–Madison, 1967.
- Ph.D. (Computer Science) University of Wisconsin–Madison, 1969.

== Peer-to-peer systems ==
Horowitz has been actively engaged as an expert witness testifying in numerous peer-to-peer file sharing legal cases. Generally, he has represented the copyright owner, including individual record companies, the Recording Industry Association of America, and the Motion Picture Association of America. His testimony has been cited numerous times in various decisions and orders, in particular:

- Horowitz was cited in the Arista Records LLC v. Lime Group LLC case.
- His testimony was also cited in RIAA versus MP3tunes.
- In several BitTorrent cases including MPAA versus isoHunt.

More recently, Horowitz has represented Universal Music Group (UMG) and others against the music streaming service Grooveshark.com. Summary judgment was awarded to UMG, with the decision citing Horowitz' expert reports.

== Distance education ==
In 1999, Horowitz was appointed Director of Information Technology and Distance Education in USC's Viterbi School of Engineering. Part of his responsibilities included their satellite-based closed circuit instructional network. He renamed the organization USC's Distance Education Network (DEN) and moved course delivery from satellite to the Web. DEN currently offers numerous graduate level courses leading to master's degrees, primarily in computer science and electrical engineering. In 2000 he received an outstanding distance education educator award from R1edu.org.

== Selected publications ==
Ellis Horowitz has published numerous technical articles and several books, including:

- 1975. Horowitz, Ellis (March 1975). Practical Strategies for Developing Large Software Systems (1 ed.). Addison-Wesley Publishing Co. ISBN 0-20102977-4.
- 1984. Horowitz, Ellis; Sahni, Sartaj (1984). Fundamentals of Computer Algorithms (1 ed.). New York, USA: Computer Science Press, division of W. H. Freeman.
- 1989. Horowitz, Ellis; Sahni, Sartaj (1989). Fundamentals of Data Structures in Turbo Pascal: for the IBM PC. Rockville, MD: Computer Science Press. ISBN 978-0-716-78152-3.
- 1997. Horowitz, Ellis; Sahni, Sartaj; Rajasekaran, Sanguthevar (1997). Computer Algorithms/C++. New York, NY: Computer Science Press. ISBN 978-0-716-78315-2.
- 2007. Horowitz, Ellis; Sahni, Sartaj; Anderson-Freed, Susan (2007). Fundamentals of Data Structures in C (2 ed.). New York, USA: Computer Science Press, division of W. H. Freeman. ISBN 978-0-92930640-7.
