= Scherr =

Scherr may refer to:

== Surname ==
- Adam Scherr (ring name Braun Strowman; born 1983), American strongman and professional wrestler
- Allan L. Scherr (born 1940), American computer scientist
- Johannes Scherr (1817–1886), German writer
- Mary Ann Scherr (1921–2016), American designer and educator
- Rachel Scherr, American physicist
- Tony Scherr, American jazz musician
- Uwe Scherr (born 1966), retired German football player
- Bill Scherr (born 1961), American olympic wrestler

== Other uses ==
- Scherr, West Virginia, U.S.
- Scherr Formation, a bedrock formation covering several U.S. states
