= Janka Chlebíková =

Slovak computer scientist

Janka Chlebíková is a Slovak computer scientist specializing in graph algorithms, combinatorial optimization, and hardness of approximation. She is a senior lecturer and associate head for partnerships in the school of computing at the University of Portsmouth in England.

== Education and career ==
Chlebíková earned a diploma (master's degree) in mathematics from Charles University in 1988, a doctorate in mathematics from Charles University, and a second doctorate in computer science from Comenius University in 2000.

After working as a software developer, she became a lecturer at Comenius University in 1995. She became a postdoctoral researcher at the University of Kiel from 2001 to 2004, and then returned to Comenius University as an associate professor from 2004 to 2008 before moving to the University of Portsmouth in 2009.

== Personal life ==
Chlebíková is married to Miroslav Chlebík, a mathematician at the University of Sussex. Their daughter Andrea, a quadrilingual child prodigy in mathematics, studies atmospheric science at the University of Cambridge.
