= Sartaj Sahni =

American computer scientist

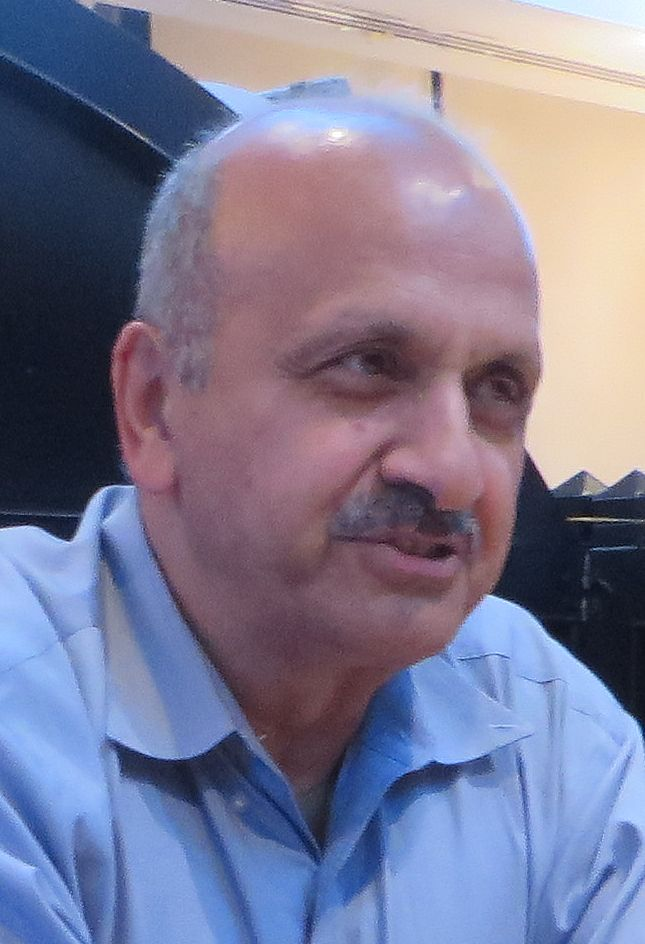
- Prof. Sartaj Sahni in 2015.
- Born: July 22, 1949 (age 77); Pune, India
- Education: Indian Institute of Technology, Cornell University
- Known for: Data structures, Algorithms
- Awards: IEEE Computer Society Taylor L. Booth Education Award, 1997; IEEE Computer Society W. Wallace McDowell Award, 2003; ACM Karl Karlstrom Outstanding Educator Award, 2003
- Scientific career
- Fields: Computer science
- Workplaces: University of Florida
- Doctoral advisor: Ellis Horowitz
- Doctoral students: Teofilo F. Gonzalez

Professor Sartaj Kumar Sahni (born July 22, 1949, in Pune, India) is a computer scientist based in the United States, and is one of the pioneers in the field of data structures. He is a distinguished professor in the Department of Computer and Information Science and Engineering at the University of Florida.

== Education ==
Sahni received his BTech degree in electrical engineering from the Indian Institute of Technology Kanpur. Following this, he undertook his graduate studies at Cornell University in the US, earning a PhD degree in 1973, under the supervision of Ellis Horowitz.

== Research and publications ==
Sahni has published over 280 research papers and written 15 textbooks. His research publications are on the design and analysis of efficient algorithms, data structures, parallel computing, interconnection networks, design automation, and medical algorithms.

With his advisor Ellis Horowitz, Sahni wrote two widely used textbooks, Fundamentals of Computer Algorithms and Fundamentals of Data Structures. He has also written highly cited research papers on the NP-completeness of approximately solving certain optimization problems, on open shop scheduling, on parallel algorithms for matrix multiplication and their application in graph theory, and on improved exponential time exact algorithms for the subset sum problem, among his many other research results.

=== Books ===
- Concepts in Discrete Mathematics. Fridley, MN: Camelot Pub. Co. 1985. ISBN 978-0-942-45000-2.
- Fundamentals of Data Structures in Turbo Pascal: for the IBM PC. Rockville, MD: Computer Science Press. 1989. ISBN 978-0-716-78152-3.
- Software Development in C. Summit, NJ: Silicon Press. 1995. ISBN 978-0-929-30616-2.
- Computer Algorithms/C++. New York, NY: Computer Science Press. 1997. ISBN 978-0-716-78315-2.
- Data Structures, Algorithms, and Applications in C++. Boston, MA: McGraw-Hill. 1998. ISBN 978-0-071-09219-7.
- Data Structures, Algorithms, and Applications in Java. Boston, MA: McGraw-Hill. 2000. ISBN 978-0-071-09217-3.
- Software Development in Java. Summit, NJ: Silicon Press. 2003. ISBN 978-0-929-30626-1.
- Handbook of Data Structures and Applications. Boca Raton, FL: Chapman & Hall/CRC. 2005. ISBN 978-1-584-88435-4.
- Fundamentals of Data Structures in C (2 ed.). New York: Computer Science Press, division of W. H. Freeman. 2007. ISBN 978-0-929-30640-7.
- Information Systems, Technology and Management. Berlin, Heidelberg: Springer Berlin Heidelberg. 2010. ISBN 978-3-642-12034-3.
- Handbook of Data Structures and Applications (2 ed.). Boca Raton, FL: CRC Press. 2018. ISBN 978-1-315-11933-5.

== Awards and honors ==
In 1997, Sahni was awarded the IEEE Computer Society's Taylor L. Booth Education Award and in 2003 he was awarded the IEEE Computer Society McDowell Award. Sahni was also awarded the 2003 Karl V. Karlstrom Outstanding Educator Award of the Association for Computing Machinery.

Professor Sahni is a member of the European Academy of Sciences. He was elected as a Fellow of the Institute of Electrical and Electronics Engineers in 1988, and of the Association for Computing Machinery in 1996; he is also a fellow of the American Association for the Advancement of Science, elected in 1995. He is a Distinguished Alumnus of the Indian Institute of Technology, Kanpur.

Sahni was given the Honorary Professor Award of Asia University in 2009.

== Volunteer activities ==
He has served as editor-in-chief of ACM Computing Surveys.
