= Ruth E. Davis =

American computer scientist

Ruth Ellen Davis is an American computer scientist whose research has focused on formal specification in software engineering, logic programming, and functional programming. She is a professor in the Computer Science and Engineering Department at Santa Clara University.

== Education and career ==
Davis was an undergraduate at Santa Clara University, where she received her bachelor's degree in 1973. After a 1976 master's degree from San Jose State University, she completed her Ph.D. in 1979 at the University of California, Santa Cruz. Her dissertation, Generating Correct Programs from Logic Specifications, was supervised by Sharon Sickel.

She was hired as an assistant professor at Santa Clara University in 1979, becoming the university's first female tenure-track faculty member in engineering. She was promoted to associate professor in 1986 and to full professor in 1994. She served as associate dean for undergraduate studies in engineering beginning in 2003. She held the Robert W. Peters Endowed Professorship in Engineering from 2004 to 2009 and was given the Lee and Seymour Graff Professorship and University Endowed Chair in 2009. In 2024 she stepped down as associate dean.

== Recognition ==
Davis received the 1980 Association for Computing Machinery (ACM) Doctoral Dissertation Award. She was named as an ACM Distinguished Scientist in 2006, and as a Distinguished Engineering Educator of the Society of Women Engineers in 2020.
