= Teofilo F. Gonzalez =

Mexican-American computer scientist (born 1948)

Teofilo (Teo) Gonzalez
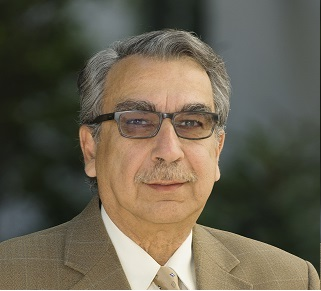
- Born: January 26, 1948 (age 78); Monterrey, Mexico
- Education: ITESM (B.S., 1972); University of Minnesota (Ph.D., 1975)
- Occupation: Professor of Computer Science UCSB
- Known for: Hardness of approximation, algorithms
- Scientific career
- Fields: Computer science
- Workplaces: University of Oklahoma; Pennsylvania State University; Monterrey Institute of Technology and Higher Education; University of Texas at Dallas; UC Santa Barbara
- Doctoral advisor: Sartaj Sahni
- Website: www.cs.ucsb.edu/~teo

Teofilo Francisco Gonzalez Arce (born January 26, 1948, in Monterrey, Mexico) is a Mexican-American computer scientist who is professor emeritus of computer science at the University of California, Santa Barbara.

In 1972, Gonzalez was one of the first students who earned a bachelor's degree in computer science (Ingeniero en Sistemas Computacionales) in Mexico, at the Monterrey Institute of Technology and Higher Education. He completed his Ph.D. in 1975 from the University of Minnesota under the supervision of Sartaj Sahni. He taught at the University of Oklahoma from 1975 to 1976, at the Pennsylvania State University from 1976 to 1979, at the Monterrey Institute of Technology and Higher Education from 1979 to 1980, and at the University of Texas at Dallas from 1980 to 1984, before joining the UCSB computer science faculty in 1984. He spent Sabbatical Leaves at Utrecht University (1990) in the Netherlands and the Monterrey Institute of Technology and Higher Education. Professor Gonzalez became a Fellow of IASTED in 2009.

Gonzalez is known for his highly cited pioneering research in the hardness of approximation;^{[SG76]} for his sub-linear and best possible approximation algorithm (unless P = NP) based on the farthest-first traversal for the metric k-center problem^{[G85]} (k-tMM clustering); and for introducing the open-shop scheduling problem as well as algorithms for its solution that have found numerous applications in several research areas as well as for his research on flow shop scheduling, and job shop scheduling algorithms.^{[GS76]}^{[GS78]} He is the editor of the Handbook on Approximation Algorithms and Metaheuristics first edition^{[G07]}, second edition^{[G18]} and he is co-editor of Volume 1 (Computer Science and Software Engineering) of the Computing Handbook Set.^{[CH]}

== Selected publications ==
GS76.	Gonzalez, Teofilo; Sahni, Sartaj (1976), "Open shop scheduling to minimize finish time", Journal of the ACM, 23 (4): 665–679, doi:10.1145/321978.321985, MR 0429089, S2CID 1642775

SG76.	Sahni, Sartaj; Gonzalez, Teofilo (1976), "P-complete approximation problems", Journal of the ACM, 23 (3): 555–565, doi:10.1145/321958.321975, hdl:10338.dmlcz/103883, MR 0408313, S2CID 207548581.

GS78.	Gonzalez, Teofilo; Sahni, Sartaj (1978), "Flowshop and jobshop schedules: complexity and approximation", Operations Research, 26 (1): 36–52, doi:10.1287/opre.26.1.36, MR 0465149.

G85.	Gonzalez, T. F. (1985), "Clustering to minimize the maximum intercluster distance", Theoretical Computer Science, 38 (2–3): 293–306, Bibcode:1985TComS..38..293G, doi:10.1016/0304-3975(85)90224-5, MR 0807927.

G07.	Handbook of Approximation Algorithms and Metaheuristics (1 ed.), Cambridge, Mass.: Chapman and Hall/CRC, 2007-05-15, ISBN 9780262633246

G18.	Handbook of Approximation Algorithms and Metaheuristics (2 ed.), Cambridge, Mass.: Chapman and Hall/CRC, 2018, ISBN 9780367570286

CH.	T.F. Gonzalez, J. Diaz-Herrera, A. Tucker}, Editors, Computing Handbook: Computer Science and Software Engineering, Third Edition: Two-Volume Set, CRC Press, ISBN 978-1439898529
