= Raluca Ada Popa =

Computer scientist at UC Berkeley

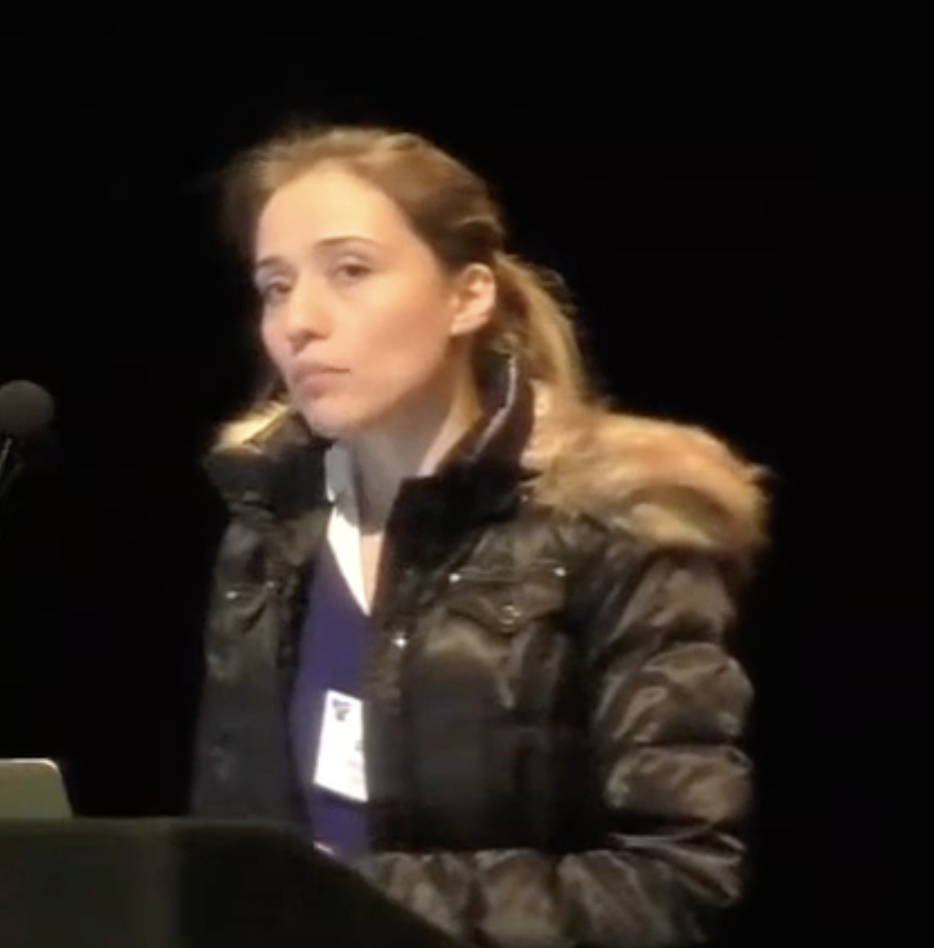
- Popa presenting at a conference in 2017
- Born: 1986 or 1987 (age 39–40); Sibiu, Romania
- Awards: Grace Murray Hopper Award (2019)

Academic background
- Education: Massachusetts Institute of Technology (PhD, MEng, BS)
- Thesis: Building practical systems that compute on encrypted data (2014)
- Doctoral advisor: Nickolai Zeldovich

Academic work
- Discipline: Computer science
- Sub-discipline: Functional encryption, Homomorphic encryption
- Institutions: University of California, Berkeley

Raluca Ada Popa is a computer science associate professor at the University of California, Berkeley. Her research focuses on applied cryptography, including in the fields of healthcare and banking. Popa was awarded the 2021 Grace Murray Hopper Award for "contributions to the design of more practical distributed systems for secure computation over encrypted data."

== Biography ==
Raluca Ada Popa was born in Sibiu, a city in central Romania, in 1986 or 1987. She studied computer science at the Massachusetts Institute of Technology, earning a BS in 2009 and an MEng in 2010. Popa continued her studies at MIT, studying under cryptography researcher Nickolai Zeldovich. She graduated with a PhD in 2014, with a dissertation titled Building practical systems that compute on encrypted data.

In 2011, Popa and her colleagues and advisor at the MIT Computer Science and Artificial Intelligence Laboratory developed CryptDB, a new technology for homomorphic encryption in SQL databases. A 2024 paper described CryptDB as "the first encrypted database scheme supporting all standard SQL queries over the encrypted data without any client-side query processing."

Popa completed a postdoctoral fellowship at ETH Zurich, and joined the faculty of the UC Berkeley College of Engineering in 2015. She is the co-founder of cybersecurity startup companies PreVeil and Opaque Systems.

In 2019, Popa was awarded the ACM Grace Murray Hopper Award for her contributions to the design of secure distributed systems. She joined the staff of Google DeepMind as a research scientist in 2025, working on cybersecurity in generative AI systems.

== Personal life ==
In a 2023 interview with Libertatea, Popa said that she has one child.

== Selected publications ==
- Popa, Raluca Ada; Redfield, Catherine M. S.; Zeldovich, Nickolai; Balakrishnan, Hari (2011). CryptDB: protecting confidentiality with encrypted query processing. Proceedings of the Twenty-Third ACM Symposium on Operating Systems Principles. Association for Computing Machinery. pp. 85–100. doi:10.1145/2043556.2043566. hdl:1721.1/74107. ISBN 978-1-4503-0977-6.
