= Pedro Felipe Felzenszwalb =

American computer scientist

- Education: Cornell University; Massachusetts Institute of Technology
- Awards: Longuet-Higgins Prize (2010, 2018); Grace Murray Hopper Award (2013); Edward J. McCluskey Technical Achievement Award (2014)
- Scientific career
- Fields: Computer vision; Artificial intelligence; Machine learning; Discrete mathematics
- Institutions: Brown University
- Thesis: Representation and Detection of Shapes in Images (2003)
- Doctoral advisor: Eric Grimson

Pedro Felipe Felzenszwalb is a computer scientist and professor of the School of Engineering and Department of Computer Science at Brown University.

== Career ==
Felzenszwalb studied computer science at Cornell University, receiving his B.S. in 1999. There, he began researching computer vision and artificial intelligence with Daniel P. Huttenlocher. He earned his M.S. and Ph.D. degrees from the Massachusetts Institute of Technology in 2001 and 2003, respectively.

Felzenszwalb joined the University of Chicago as an assistant professor in 2004 and was made associate professor in 2008. He joined Brown University as an associate professor in 2011 and became a full professor in 2016.

In 2010 Felzenszwalb was awarded the Longuet-Higgins Prize for his work in the field of computer vision. In 2013, he was awarded the Grace Murray Hopper Award by the Association for Computing Machinery for his contributions to the problem of object recognition in pictures and video. In 2014, he was awarded the Edward J. McCluskey Technical Achievement Award by the IEEE for his work with object recognition with deformable models. In 2018, Felzenszwalb received the Longuet-Higgins Prize for fundamental contributions to computer vision a second time. This prize was first awarded in 2005, and Felzenszwalb is among a select group of repeat winners.

== Selected publications ==
- Felzenszwalb, Pedro F.; Huttenlocher, Daniel P. (September 2012). "Distance Transforms of Sampled Functions". Theory of Computing. 8 (19): 415–428. doi:10.4086/toc.2012.v008a019.
- Felzenszwalb, P F; Girshick, R B; McAllester, D; Ramanan, D (September 2010). "Object Detection with Discriminatively Trained Part-Based Models". IEEE Transactions on Pattern Analysis and Machine Intelligence. 32 (9): 1627–1645. Bibcode:2010ITPAM..32.1627F. doi:10.1109/TPAMI.2009.167. PMID 20634557. S2CID 3198903.
- Felzenszwalb, Pedro F.; Huttenlocher, Daniel P. (January 2005). "Pictorial Structures for Object Recognition". International Journal of Computer Vision. 61 (1): 55–79. doi:10.1023/B:VISI.0000042934.15159.49. S2CID 2277383.
- Pedro F. Felzenszwalb; Daniel P. Huttenlocher (1 May 2006). "Efficient Belief Propagation for Early Vision". International Journal of Computer Vision. 70 (1): 41–54. doi:10.1007/S11263-006-7899-4. ISSN 0920-5691. Wikidata Q56221805.
- Felzenszwalb, Pedro F.; Huttenlocher, Daniel P. (September 2004). "Efficient Graph Based Image Segmentation". International Journal of Computer Vision. 59 (2): 167–181. doi:10.1023/B:VISI.0000022288.19776.77. S2CID 207663697.
