= ACM Student Research Competition =

International computing research competition

The ACM Student Research Competition (ACM SRC) is an international computing research competition for university students. The competition is held annually and split into undergraduate and graduate divisions, organized by the Association for Computing Machinery. With several hundred annual participants, the Student Research Competition is considered the world's largest university-level research contest in the field of computing.

The competition started as a travel grant program in 2003 and was previously sponsored by Microsoft. The winners of the competition are recognized at the ACM Awards Banquet, alongside the Turing Award winners.

== Structure ==
The first round of competition spans more than 20 major ACM conferences, hosting special poster sessions to showcase research submitted by students. Selected semi-finalists add a slide presentation and compete for prizes in both undergraduate and graduate categories based on their knowledge, contribution, and quality of presentation. Those taking first place at the second-level competitions are invited to compete in the annual Grand Finals. Three top students in each category are selected as winners each year.

First-round conferences include the ACM/IEEE Supercomputing Conference, the International Conference on Computer Graphics and Interactive Techniques (SIGGRAPH), the International Conference on Software Engineering (ICSE), the Grace Hopper Celebration of Women in Computing, and SIGPLAN's Conference on Programming Language Design and Implementation, and many others.

== Previous Winners ==
Year	Undergraduate Winners	Graduate Winners
2026	1. Anha Khan (Princeton University); 2. Natalie Nguyen (Cornell University); 3. Tanvi Ganapathy (California Institute of Technology)	1. Charles Averill (University of Texas, Dallas); 2. Narges Alavisamani (Georgia Institute of Technology); 3. Sarah Dunn (University of Edinburgh)
2025	1. Jason Han (Rice University); 2. Craig Liu (Purdue University); 3. Jizheng He (University of Illinois, Urbana-Champaign)	1. Jordan Pettyjohn (Colorado School of Mines); 2. Haowen Lai (University of Pennsylvania); 3. Vaastav Anand (Max Planck Institute for Software Systems)
2024	1. Jakub Bachurski (University of Cambridge); 2. Amar Shah (University of California, Berkeley); 3. Rhett Olson (University of Minnesota)	1. Stefan Klessinger (University of Passau); 2. Zhewen Pan (University of Wisconsin-Madison); 3. Chengjie Lu (Simula Research Laboratory)
2023	1. Takahito Murakami (University of Tsukuba); 2. Raphael Douglas Giles (University of New South Wales); 3. Christopher Bain (University of Maryland, Baltimore County)	1. Zhe Liu (Chinese Academy of Sciences); 2. Juan Carlos Alonso Valenzuela (University of Seville); 3. Irene Zanardi (Università della Svizzera italiana)
2022	1. Zizheng Guo (Peking University); 2. Yihong Zhang (University of Washington); 3. Chen Yang (Tianjin University)	1. Ziliang Lai (The Chinese University of Hong Kong); 2. Haotiang Zhang (University of Texas at Arlington); 3. Madhurima Chakraborty (University of California, Riverside)
2021	1. Thomas B. McHugh (Northwestern University); 2. Chuangtao Chen (Zhejiang University); 3. Rakshit Mittal (Birla Institute of Technology)	1. Jiaqi Gu (University of Texas at Austin); 2. Konstantinos Kallas (University of Pennsylvania); 3. Guyue Huang (Tsinghua University)
2020	1. Zhaowei Xi (Tsinghua University); 2. Alexander Zlokapa (California Institute of Technology); 3. Ocean Hurd (University of California, Santa Cruz)	1. Peter Li (Massachusetts Institute of Technology); 2. James Davis (Virginia Tech); 3. Hasindu Gamaarachchi (University of New South Wales)
2019	1. Zhuangzhuang Zhou (Shanghai Jiao Tong University); 2. Fandel Lin (National Cheng Kung University); 3. Elizaveta Tremsina (University of California, Berkeley)	1. Gengjie Chen (The Chinese University of Hong Kong); 2. Christie Alappat (University of Erlangen-Nuremberg); 3. Scott Kolodziej (Texas A&M University)
2018	1. Tiancheng Sun (University of California, San Diego); 2. Patrick Thier (Technische Universität Wien); 3. Ayush Kohli (Southern Illinois University Carbondale)	1. Meng Li (University of Texas, Austin); 2. Jon Gjengset (Massachusetts Institute of Technology); 3. Daniel George (University of Illinois, Urbana-Champaign)
2017	1. Victor Lanvin (École Normale Supérieure Paris-Saclay); 2. Jennifer Vaccaro (Olin College of Engineering); 3. Martin Kellogg (University of Washington)	1. Kazem Cheshmi (Rutgers University); 2. Omid Abari (Massachusetts Institute of Technology); 3. Calvin Loncaric (University of Washington)
2016	1. Jeevana Priya Inala (Massachusetts Institute of Technology)	1. Swarnendu Biswas (Ohio State University); 2. Thomas Degueule (INRIA); 3. Christopher Theisen (North Carolina State University)
2015	1. Thomas Effland (University at Buffalo); 2. Mitchell Gordon (University of Rochester); 3. Shannon N. Lubetich (Pomona College)	1. Lu Xiao (Drexel University); 2. Shupeng Sun (Carnegie Mellon University); 3. Omid Abara (Massachusetts Institute of Technology)
2014	1. Bernd Huber (Karlsruhe Institute of Technology); 2. James Bornholt (Australian National University); 3. Carlo del Mundo (Virginia Tech)	1. Aadithy V. Karthik (University of California, Berkeley); 2. Sai Zhang (University of Washington); 3. Ehsan Totoni (University of Illinois at Urbana-Champaign)
2013	1. Zack Coker (Auburn University); 2. Olivier Savary-Belanger (McGill University); 3. Mairin C. Chesney (University of Michigan)	1. Heather Underwood (University of Colorado, Boulder); 2. Tiffany Inglis (Universityof Waterloo); 3. Jevavijayan Rajendran (NYU Tandon School of Engineering)
2012	1. Sarah Chasins (Swarthmore College); 2. Vanessa Pena Araya (Universidad de Chile)	1. Hyungsin Kim (Georgia Institute of Technology); 2. Yuan Tian (Auburn University); 3. Matthias Wilhelm (TU Kaiserslautern)
2011	1. Peter Calvert (University of Cambridge); 2. Tsung-Wei Huang (National Cheng Kung University); 3. Timothy Walsh (University of Delaware)	1. Swapnil Patil (Carnegie Mellon University); 2. Nurcan Durak (University of Louisville); 3. Xiangyu Dong (Penn State University)
2010	1. Manasi Vartak (Worcester Polytechnic Institute); 2. Diego Cavalcanti (Federal University of Campina Grande); 3. Eric Drewniak (Wheaton College)	1. Patrick Kelley (Carnegie Mellon University); 2. Michal Tvarozek (Slovak University of Technology); 3. Tae-Joon Kim
2009	1. Alice Zhu (Harvey Mudd College); 2. Neha Singh (Indian Institute of Technology Bombay); 3. Sarah M. Loos (Indiana University)	1. Xu Liu (University of Maryland); 2. Stratis Ioannidis (University of Toronto); 3. Ye Kyaw Thu (Waseda University)
2008	1. Anselm Grundhoefer (Bauhaus University Weimar); 2. Maria A. Kazandjieva (Mount Holyoke College); 3. Yuan-Ting E. Huang (University of British Columbia)	1. Eugene Borodin (Stony Brook University); 2. Emerson Murphy-Hill (Portland State University); 3. Bowen Hui (University of Toronto)
2007	1. Yuki Mori (University of Tokyo); 2. Scott Hale (Eckerd College); 3. Jeffrey Adair (Hiram College)	1. Danny Dig (University of Illinois at Urbana-Champaign); 2. Yalling Yang (University of Illinois at Urbana-Champaign); 3. David S. Janzen (University of Kansas)
2006	1. Eric Bodden (RWTH Aachen University); 2. Spiros Xanthos (University of Illinois at Urbana-Champaign); 3. Kamil Wnuk (Harvey Mudd College)	1. Jane Tougas (Dalhousie University); 2. Kulesh Shanmugasundaram (Polytechnic Institute of NYU); 3. Tao Xie (University of Washington)

== See also ==
- Association for Computing Machinery
- International Collegiate Programming Contest
- ACM Doctoral Dissertation Award
- List of computer science conferences
