= Emacspeak =

Audio computer desktop and speech interface

- Developer: Emacspeak Inc.
- Release: 25 April 1995; 31 years ago
- Stable release: 60.0 (DreamDog) / 3 May 2024; 2 years ago
- Preview release: Non [±]
- Written in: C, Emacs Lisp, Tcl
- Operating system: Cross-platform
- Available in: English
- Type: Screen reader for a Text editor
- License: GPL
- Website: emacspeak.sourceforge.net
- Repository: github.com/tvraman/emacspeak

Emacspeak is a free computer application, a speech interface, and an audio desktop (as opposed to a screen reader). It employs Emacs (which is written in C), Emacs Lisp, and Tcl. Developed principally by T. V. Raman (himself blind since childhood, and who has worked on voice software with Adobe Software and later IBM), it was first released in April 1995. It is portable to all POSIX-compatible OSs. It is tightly integrated with Emacs, allowing it to render intelligible and useful content rather than parsing the graphics (hence it is sometimes referred to not as a separate program, but a subsystem of Emacs); its default voice synthesizer (as of 2002, IBM's ViaVoice Text-to-Speech (TTS)) can be replaced with other software synthesizers when a server module is installed. Emacspeak is one of the most popular speech interfaces for Linux, bundled with most major distributions. In 2014, Raman wrote an article describing how the software's design was impacted by shifts in computer technology and its general usage over 20 years.

Emacspeak achieves its integration by being written largely in Emacs Lisp using "advice", enabling it to literally be a wrapper around most functions that change or otherwise modify the display. Auditorily, verbalizations are pre-emptible, and common actions like opening a menu or closing a file have a brief sound associated with that particular action; it also immediately verbalizes all insertions of characters, and attempts to speak as much of the context sentences around the cursor's present location as possible.

Emacspeak facilitates access to a wide variety of content, from the web to DAISY books.

On Monday, April 12, 1999, Emacspeak became part of the Smithsonian Museum's Permanent Research Collection on Information Technology at the Smithsonian's National Museum of American History.

== Version history ==
As of November 22, 2023, Emacspeak is at version 59. Each release was codenamed after a dog.
