= Grace Murray Hopper Award =

Computer science award

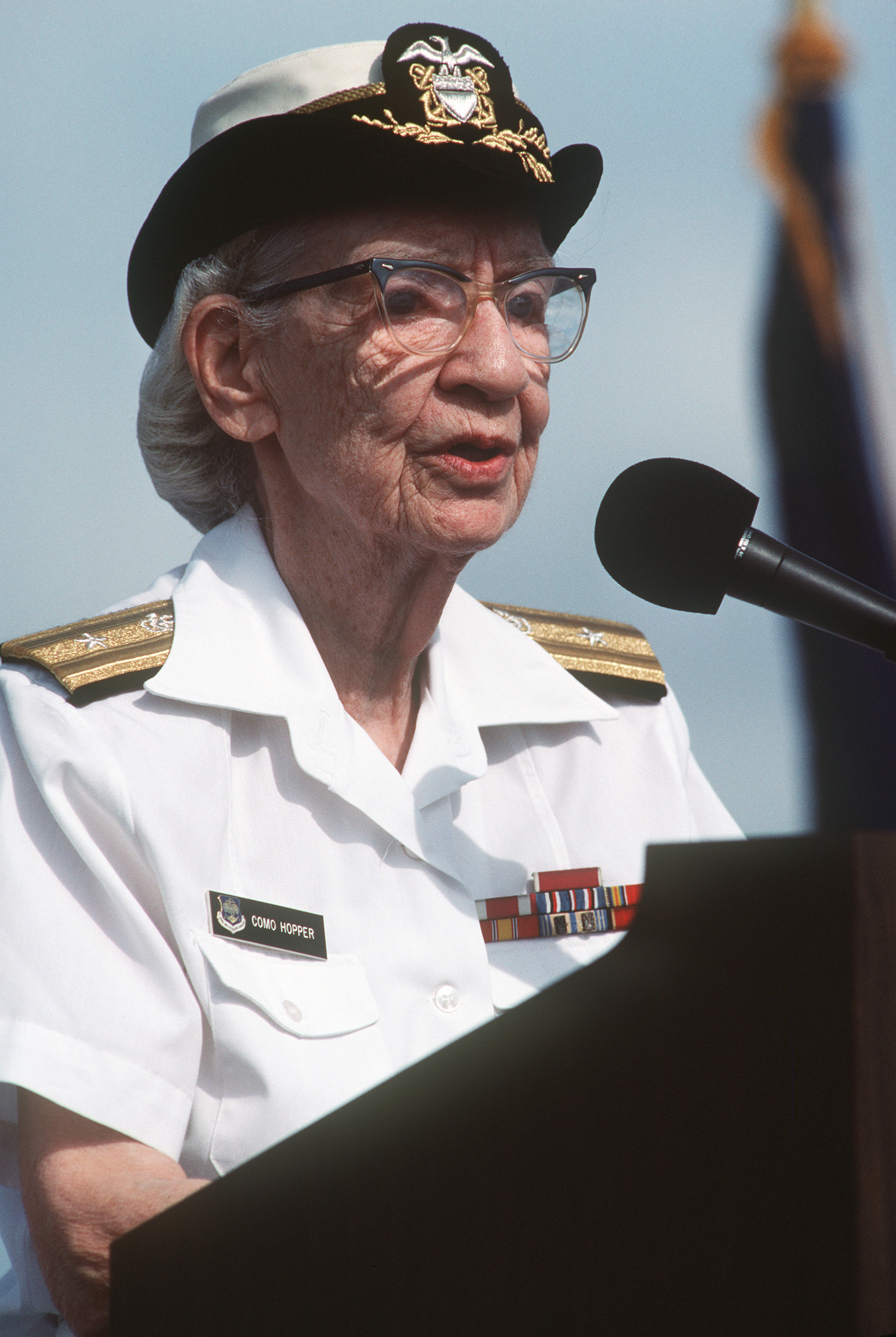
Grace Murray Hopper in 1985

The ACM Grace Murray Hopper Award is an annual prize given by the Association for Computing Machinery (ACM) for a single, significant technical or service contribution to computer science by a person (or group of people) before the age of 35. As of 2025, 51 people have been awarded the prize, with the most recent recipient being Ben Mildenhall and Pratul Srinivasan, who won in 2025.

The award is named after Grace Hopper (1906–1992), a pioneer in computing and a rear admiral in the United States Navy. Hopper is often credited as being one of the first programmers of the Harvard Mark I computer and with writing the first computer manual. (Note: A Manual of Operation for the Automatic Sequence Controlled Calculator) The award is accompanied by a prize of US$35,000, with financial support provided by Microsoft. The first recipient, in 1971, was Donald Knuth.

== Recipients ==
- 1971 Donald Knuth
- 1972 Paul H. Dirksen and Paul H. Cress
- 1973 Lawrence M. Breed, Richard H. Lathwell and Roger Moore
- 1974 George N. Baird
- 1975 Allan L. Scherr
- 1976 Edward H. Shortliffe
- 1977 no award
- 1978 Ray Kurzweil
- 1979 Steve Wozniak
- 1980 Robert M. Metcalfe
- 1981 Daniel S. Bricklin
- 1982 Brian K. Reid
- 1983 no award
- 1984 Daniel Henry Holmes Ingalls, Jr.
- 1985 Cordell Green
- 1986 William Nelson "Bill" Joy
- 1987 John Ousterhout
- 1988 Guy L. Steele Jr.
- 1989 W. Daniel Hillis
- 1990 Richard Stallman
- 1991 Feng-hsiung Hsu
- 1992 no award
- 1993 Bjarne Stroustrup
- 1994–1995 no award
- 1996 Shafrira Goldwasser
- 1997–1998 no award
- 1999 Wen-mei Hwu
- 2000 Lydia Kavraki
- 2001 George Necula
- 2002 Ramakrishnan Srikant
- 2003 Stephen W. Keckler
- 2004 Jennifer Rexford
- 2005 Omer Reingold
- 2006 Dan Klein
- 2007 Vern Paxson
- 2008 Dawson Engler
- 2009 Tim Roughgarden
- 2010 Craig Gentry
- 2011 Luis von Ahn
- 2012 Martin Casado and Dina Katabi
- 2013 Pedro Felipe Felzenszwalb
- 2014 Sylvia Ratnasamy
- 2015 Brent Waters
- 2016 Jeffrey Heer
- 2017 Amanda Randles
- 2018 Constantinos Daskalakis and Michael J. Freedman
- 2019 Maria-Florina Balcan
- 2020 Shyam Gollakota
- 2021 Raluca Ada Popa
- 2022 Mohammad Alizadeh
- 2023 Prateek Mittal
- 2024 Ilias Diakonikolas
- 2025 Ben Mildenhall and Pratul Srinivasan

== See also ==
- List of computer-related awards
- List of computer science awards
