= T. V. Raman =

Indian computer scientist

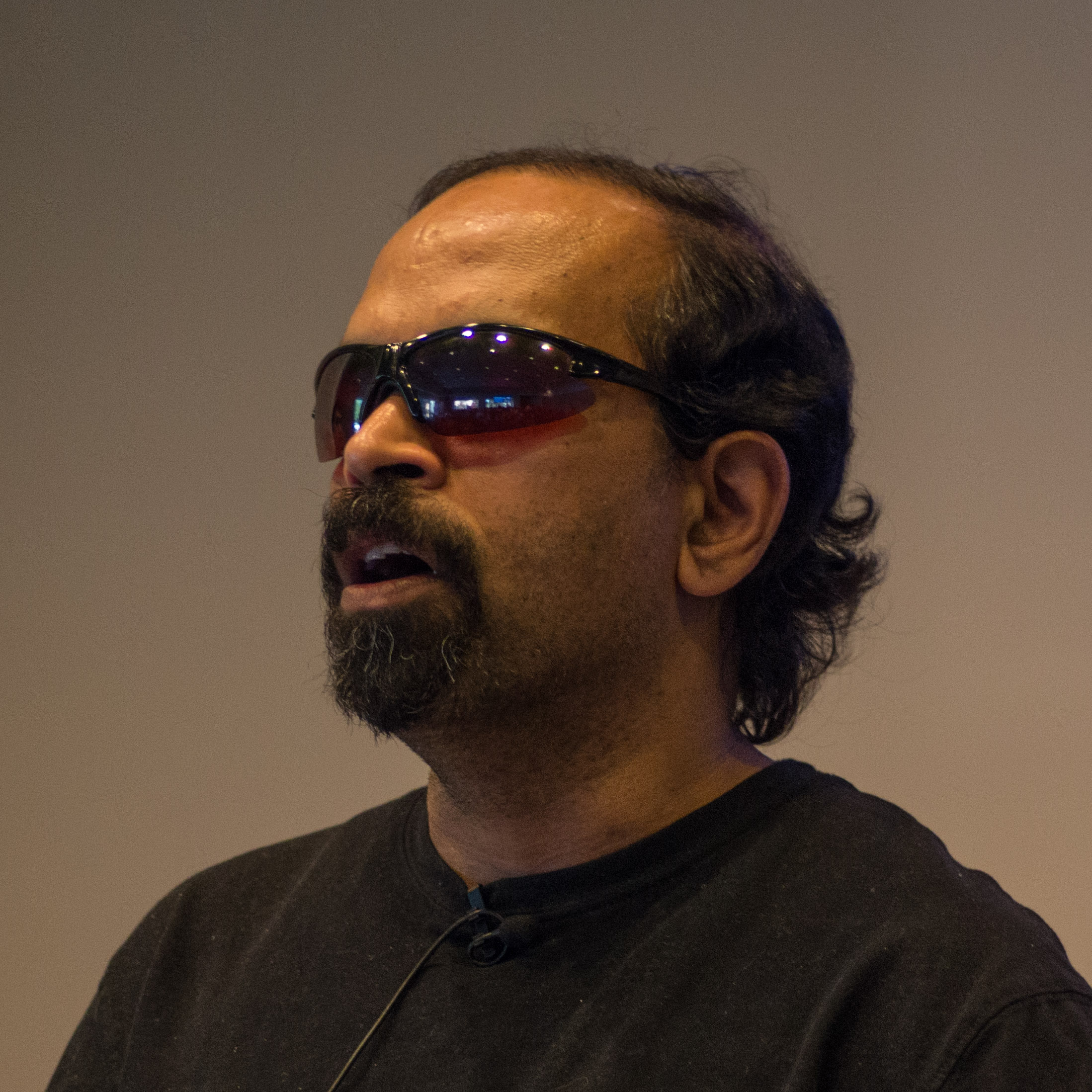
- Born: 4 May 1965 (age 61); Pune, India
- Education: (B.S.) Pune University (M.S.) IIT Bombay (PhD) Cornell University
- Occupations: Computer Scientist, Accessibility researcher
- Awards: ACM Doctoral Dissertation Award, 1994
- Website: https://emacspeak.sourceforge.net/raman/

T. V. Raman (born 4 May 1965) is an Indian American computer scientist who specializes in accessibility research. His research interests are primarily in the areas of auditory user interfaces and structured electronic documents. He has worked on speech interaction and markup technologies in the context of the World Wide Web at Digital's Cambridge Research Lab (CRL), Adobe Systems and IBM Research. He currently works at Google Research. Raman has himself been partially sighted since birth, and blind since the age of 14.

== Early life and education ==
He grew up in Pune, India. Raman became blind at the age of 14 due to glaucoma, being previously partially sighted and able to see with his left eye. To deal with his blindness he had his brother, his mentors, and his aide read out textbooks and problems to him. Although unable to see, he was able to solve Rubik's Cube with a braille version, write computer programs, and perform mathematics.

Raman attended the University of Pune with a BS in mathematics, IIT Bombay with an MS in mathematics, and Cornell University earning an MS in computer science and a PhD in applied mathematics under advisor David Gries. His PhD thesis titled "Audio System For Technical Readings (AsTeR)" was awarded the ACM Doctoral Dissertation Award in 1994.

== Career ==
Recently Raman has incorporated these features in the Chrome browser. Raman went on to apply the ideas on audio formatting introduced in AsTeR to the more general domain of computer interfaces Emacspeak. On 12 April 1999, Emacspeak became part of the Smithsonian's Permanent Research Collection on Information Technology at the Smithsonian's National Museum of American History. In 2005 he began work at Google. In 2018, IIT Bombay felicitated Raman with a Distinguished Alumnus Award

== Work ==
- AsTeR – Audio System For Technical Readings
- Aural CSS – producing rich auditory presentations from Web content
- Emacspeak – the complete audio desktop
- XForms – Next Generation Web Forms
- XML Events – A reusable eventing syntax for XML
- XHTML+Voice – Enabling the multimodal Web via voice interaction
- RDC – Reusable Dialog Components
- AxsJAX – Access Enabling AJAX
- Google Accessible Search – for finding accessible Web content
- Thinking Of Mathematics – Thinking Of Mathematics—An Essay on Eyes-Free Computing
- Eyes-Free – Speech enabled Google Android applications.
- ChromeVox – Screen reader from Google Chrome and ChromeOS
- Chakshumati At 10 Eyes-Free Stem Education In India and Chakshumati: Profile Of T.V. Raman
- Inaugural Ceremony of T V Raman experiential Accessible Computer Science Lab Chennai on Jan 3 2025 at Karnavidya Foundation RR Tower Guindy, Chennai, India

== Other interests ==
His favorite hobby is recreational mathematics, especially those that involve an intuitive feel for mathematics.
