= George N. Baird =

American computer scientist

George N. Baird is an American computer scientist. From 1967 into the 1970s, Baird worked on computer programming languages in the United States Navy under Grace Hopper. He later worked for the National Bureau of Standards. In 1974, he was awarded the Grace Murray Hopper Award in 1974 for "his successful development and implementation of the Navy's COBOL Compiler Validation System."
