= Fadel Adib =

Lebanese-American Computer Scientist and Entrepreneur

- Education: American University of Beirut (BE, 2011); Massachusetts Institute of Technology (SM, 2013; PhD, 2016)
- Known for: Wireless sensing (Wi‑Vi, WiTrack), Ocean IoT, battery‑free underwater imaging
- Scientific career
- Fields: Computer science; Electrical engineering
- Workplaces: Massachusetts Institute of Technology
- Thesis: Wireless systems that extend our senses (2017)
- Website: www.mit.edu/~fadel/

Fadel Adib is a Lebanese–American computer scientist, electrical engineer, and entrepreneur. He is an associate professor at the MIT Media Lab and in MIT's Department of Electrical Engineering and Computer Science, where he founded and directs the Signal Kinetics research group. His work focuses on wireless sensing, networking, human–computer interaction, and the "Ocean Internet of Things," including systems that enable seeing and sensing through walls and battery‑free underwater imaging. He is also the founder and CEO of Cartesian Systems, a startup focused on large‑scale wireless mapping and sensing.

== Early life and education ==
Adib grew up in Tripoli, Lebanon, and studied computer and communications engineering at the American University of Beirut (BE, 2011). He earned an SM (2013) and PhD (2016) in computer science at MIT. His master's thesis "See through walls with Wi‑Fi" and dissertation "Wireless systems that extend our senses" explored using radio signals for contactless sensing.

== Career ==
Adib joined the MIT faculty in 2016 as an assistant professor at the Media Lab, where he founded the Signal Kinetics group; he was promoted to associate professor with tenure in 2022. He has served as MIT's Doherty Chair in Ocean Utilization, reflecting his group's focus on ocean sensing and communications.

=== Research ===
Adib has worked on wireless sensing systems that use radio frequency signals to perceive humans and environments without wearables. His early work with Dina Katabi introduced **Wi‑Vi**, which used low‑power Wi‑Fi signals to detect and track people through walls, and **WiTrack**, a 3‑D through‑wall motion‑tracking system; these results were broadly covered in the technology press.

Later, Adib's team developed **RF‑Capture** (capturing a coarse human figure through walls) and contributed to RF‑based human‑pose estimation (**RF‑Pose**).

In ocean sensing, his group reported a **battery‑free, wireless underwater camera**, published in Nature Communications. His team has also published on underwater acoustic backscatter communication and long‑range battery‑free networking.

=== Entrepreneurship ===
Adib founded **Cartesian Systems**, the company builds wireless mapping and sensing platforms and has received U.S. NSF SBIR funding. Earlier, his graduate research contributed to the formation of Emerald Innovations, which develops contactless health‑monitoring systems.

== Awards and honors ==
- Great Arab Minds Award (Engineering & Technology), 2023.
- ACM SIGMOBILE Rockstar Award, 2022.
- Sloan Research Fellowship, 2021.
- Office of Naval Research Young Investigator Award, 2019.
- National Science Foundation CAREER Award, 2019.
- ACM SIGMOBILE Doctoral Dissertation Award, 2018 (for Wireless Systems that Extend Our Senses).
- MIT Technology Review Innovators Under 35, 2014; Forbes 30 Under 30 (Enterprise Technology), 2015.
- ACM SIGMOBILE Test‑of‑Time Award (for "See Through Walls with Wi‑Fi!"), 2023 (co‑recipient).

== Selected publications ==
- F. Adib and D. Katabi, "See Through Walls with Wi‑Fi!," ACM SIGCOMM CCR 43(4):75–86 (2013).
- F. Adib, Z. Kabelac, D. Katabi, and R. C. Miller, "3D Tracking via Body Radio Reflections," USENIX NSDI (2014).
- F. Adib, C.-Y. Hsu, H. Mao, D. Katabi, and F. Durand, "Capturing the Human Figure Through a Wall," ACM Transactions on Graphics 34(6) (SIGGRAPH Asia 2015).
- S. S. Afzal, W. Akbar, O. Rodriguez, M. Doumet, U. Ha, R. Ghaffarivardavagh, and F. Adib, "Battery‑free wireless imaging of underwater environments," Nature Communications (2022).

== See also ==
- Dina Katabi
- Wireless sensor network
- Human–computer interaction
