= Boaz Barak =

Theoretical computer scientist

- בועז ברק
- Born: 1974 (age 51–52)
- Occupation: professor of computer science
- Known for: professor of computer science at Harvard University

Academic background
- Education: B.Sc. in mathematics and computer science. Ph.D.
- Alma mater: Weizmann Institute of Science
- Thesis: Non-Black-Box Techniques in Cryptography
- Doctoral advisor: Oded Goldreich

Boaz Barak (Hebrew: בועז ברק, born 1974) is an Israeli-American professor of computer science at Harvard University, and a member of technical staff at OpenAI.

== Early life and education ==
He graduated in 1999 with a B.Sc. in mathematics and computer science from Tel Aviv University. In 2004, he received his Ph.D. from the Weizmann Institute of Science with thesis Non-Black-Box Techniques in Cryptography under the supervision of Oded Goldreich. Barak was at the Institute for Advanced Study for two years from 2003 to 2005. He was an assistant professor in the computer science department of Princeton University from 2005 to 2010 and an associate professor from 2010 to 2011. From 2010 to 2016, he was a researcher at Microsoft's New England research laboratory. Since 2016, he is the Gordon McKay Professor of Computer Science in the Harvard John A. Paulson School of Engineering and Applied Sciences. He is a citizen of both Israel and the United States.

== Career ==
He co-authored, with Sanjeev Arora, Computational Complexity: A Modern Approach, published by Cambridge University Press in 2009. Barak also wrote extensive notes with David Steurer on the sum of squares algorithm and occasionally blogs on the Windows on Theory blog. In 2013, he, Robert J. Goldston, and Alexander Glaser worked to design a "zero-knowledge" system to verify that warheads designated for disarmament are actually what they purport to be. By directing high-energy neutrons into the warhead under investigation, and comparing the distribution passing through to the distribution that passed through a known warhead, inspectors can determine whether a warhead being disarmed is genuine or a ruse designed to evade treaty requirements, without leaking nuclear secrets. For this work, he was selected for Foreign Policy's Top 100 Global Thinkers issue for 2014.

In 2014 Barak was an invited speaker at the International Congress of Mathematics at Seoul. With Mark Braverman, Xi Chen, and Anup Rao, he won the 2016 SIAM Outstanding Paper Prize for the paper “How to Compress Interactive Communication”. He was named to the 2022 class of ACM Fellows, "for contributions to theoretical computer science, in particular cryptography and computational complexity, and service to the theory community". Barak joined OpenAI as a Member of Technical Staff, on their alignment team, in January 2024.

== Patents ==
- U.S. Patent 7,003,677, “Method for operating proactively secured applications on an insecure system” with Amir Herzberg, Dalit Naor and Eldad Shai of IBM Haifa Research Lab. Filed November 1999, granted February 2006.
