= Allan L. Scherr =

American computer scientist (born 1940)

- Born: November 18, 1940 (age 84); Baltimore, Maryland
- Education: Baltimore Polytechnic Institute; Massachusetts Institute of Technology
- Awards: Grace Murray Hopper Award (1975)
- Scientific career
- Fields: Computer science
- Thesis: An Analysis of Time-Shared Computer Systems (1965)

Allan Lee Scherr (born November 18, 1940) is an American computer scientist notable for his work in time-sharing operating systems and leading the original development of the IBM MVS operating system, used on IBM mainframe computers.

Scherr was born in Baltimore, Maryland, on November 18, 1940. In 1958, he graduated from the Baltimore Polytechnic Institute. In 1962, he earned his S.B. and S.M. at the Massachusetts Institute of Technology, where his studies were focused on computer logic design.

As a Ph.D. student at MIT, Scherr was a part of the original group of graduate students in Project MAC (a part of the future Computer Science and Artificial Intelligence Laboratory) and earned a Ph.D. in 1965. His research involved measuring and modeling the performance of the Compatible Time-Sharing System, which earned him the Grace Murray Hopper Award in 1975.

In 1965, Scherr joined IBM. He worked on the architecture for the IBM System/370 computers and did work that was instrumental in establishing the IBM System/360 Operating System. In 1971, he became a part of the IBM task force that proposed the creation of MVS, and managed the project until its release in 1974. In 1977, he took over the management of the development of the IBM DPPX for the IBM 8100 minicomputer. In 1991, he became vice president of technology of the IBM Consulting Group. He was named an IBM Fellow in recognition of his contributions to IBM.

After leaving IBM, he retired from the EMC Corporation in 2001, where he was senior vice president of software engineering. In 2015 he ran for Town Board of Rhinebeck, New York.
