= W. H. Freeman and Company =

Publishing imprint of Macmillan Higher Education

- Parent company: Macmillan Publishers
- Founded: 1946
- Founder: William H. Freeman
- Country of origin: United States
- Publication types: Textbooks
- Nonfiction topics: Science
- Official website: www.macmillanlearning.com

W. H. Freeman and Company is an imprint of Macmillan Higher Education, a division of Macmillan Publishers. Macmillan publishes monographs and textbooks for the sciences under the imprint.

== History ==
The company, W. H. Freeman and Company Publishing was founded in 1946 by William H. Freeman Jr., who had been a salesman and editor at Macmillan Publishing.

Freeman later founded Freeman, Cooper and Company in San Francisco.

== Works ==
Titles published by W. H. Freeman include James Watson's Recombinant DNA (1983), William J. Kaufmann III's The Universe (1985), Jon Rogawski's Calculus (2007), and Peter Atkins’ Physical Chemistry (2014).
