= Subhash Khot =

Indian computer scientist (born 1978)

Subhash Khot FRS
- Born: 10 June 1978 (age 48); Ichalkaranji, Maharashtra, India
- Education: Princeton University, IIT Bombay
- Known for: Unique games conjecture
- Awards: Waterman Award (2010); Rolf Nevanlinna Prize (2014); MacArthur Fellow (2016); Fellow of the Royal Society (2017)
- Scientific career
- Fields: Computer Science
- Workplaces: Georgia Tech; Courant Institute of Mathematical Sciences; University of Chicago
- Doctoral advisor: Sanjeev Arora

Subhash Khot (born 10 June 1978 in Ichalkaranji) is an Indian-American mathematician and theoretical computer scientist who is the Julius Silver Professor of Computer Science in the Courant Institute of Mathematical Sciences at New York University. Khot has contributed to the field of computational complexity, and is best known for his unique games conjecture.

Khot received the 2014 Rolf Nevanlinna Prize by the International Mathematical Union and received the MacArthur Fellowship in 2016. He was elected a Fellow of the Royal Society in 2017 and was inducted into the National Academy of Sciences in 2023.

== Education ==
Khot obtained his bachelor's degree in computer science from the Indian Institute of Technology Bombay in 1999. He received his doctorate degree in computer science from Princeton University in 2003 under the supervision of Sanjeev Arora. His doctoral dissertation was titled "New Techniques for Probabilistically Checkable Proofs and Inapproximability Results."

== Honours and awards ==
Khot is a two time silver medallist representing India at the International Mathematical Olympiad (1994 and 1995). Khot topped the highly difficult IIT JEE entrance exam in 1995.

He has been awarded the Microsoft Research New Faculty Fellowship Award (2005), the Alan T. Waterman Award (2010), the Rolf Nevanlinna Prize for his work on the Unique Games Conjecture (2014), and the MacArthur Fellowship (2016).

He was elected a fellow of the Royal Society in 2017, and was elected to the National Academy of Sciences in 2023. In 2026, he received the Michael and Sheila Held Prize.
