= Dina Katabi =

American computer scientist

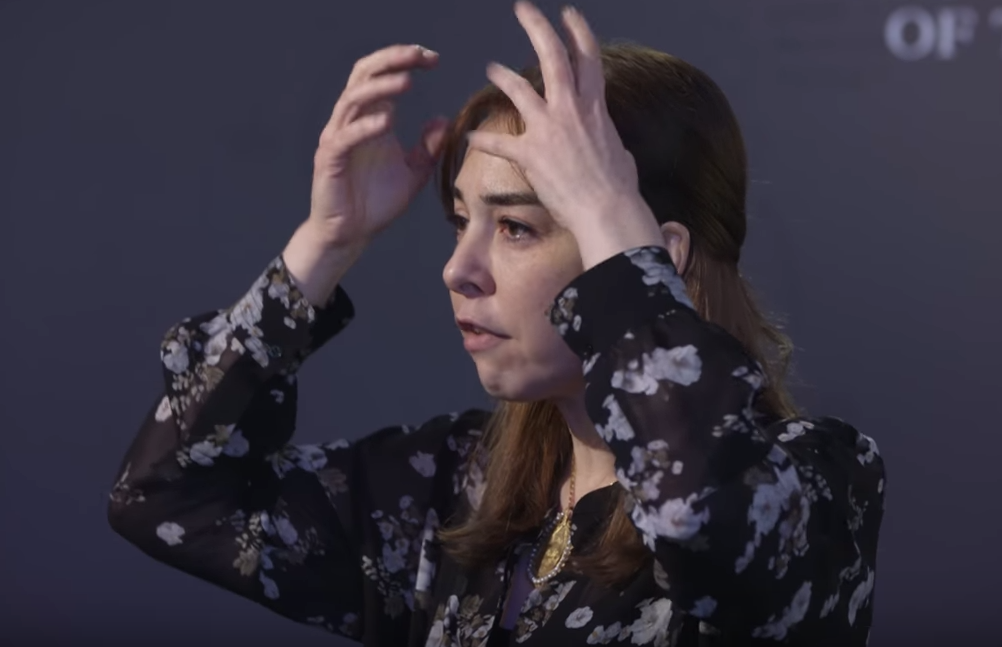
- Born: Damascus, Syria
- Education: Massachusetts Institute of Technology, Damascus University
- Known for: Congestion control, Sparse Fourier transform, wireless network, X-ray vision
- Awards: ACM Prize in Computing (2017); MacArthur Fellowship (2013); Association for Computing Machinery Fellow (2013); Grace Murray Hopper Award (2013); IEEE Communication Society William R. Bennett Prize (2009); Sloan Fellowship from the Alfred P. Sloan Foundation (2006); Career Award from the National Science Foundation (2005); Sprowls Dissertation Award (2003) from MIT; ACM Doctoral Dissertation Award Honorable Mention (2003) from ACM
- Scientific career
- Fields: Computer science, electrical engineering
- Workplaces: Massachusetts Institute of Technology
- Thesis: Decoupling Congestion Control and Bandwidth Allocation Policy With Application to High Bandwidth-Delay Product Networks (2003)
- Doctoral advisor: David D. Clark
- Doctoral students: Fadel Adib

Dina Katabi (Arabic: دينا قَتابي) is the Andrew and Erna Viterbi Professor of Electrical Engineering and Computer Science at MIT and the director of the MIT Wireless Center. She was designated as one of the world's most influential women engineers by Forbes magazine in 2023.

== Early life ==
Katabi was born into a family of doctors in Damascus. Though her initial plan was to follow this same career path, she discovered a passion for computer science while at college.

== Academic biography ==
Katabi received a bachelor's degree in electrical engineering from the University of Damascus in 1995, then an M.S in Computer Science and a Ph.D. in Computer Systems Networking and Telecommunications from MIT in 1998 and 2003, respectively. In 2003, Katabi joined MIT, where she holds the title of Professor in the Department of Electrical Engineering and Computer Science. She is the co-director of the MIT Center for Wireless Networks and Mobile Computing and a principal investigator at MIT's Computer Science and Artificial Intelligence Laboratory.

== Research and career ==
Katabi's research focused on signals, machine learning and health. Her work started in networks (especially the congestion control challenge), where she found solutions for a better reliability of networks. Then, with her team, she used machine learning and signals to analyze the human body. Based on how RF signals bounce off of human bodies, the researchers could measure human breathing, heart rates, emotion and sleep stages, without having the "patient" wear any sensor. Her most recent research combined medicine with AI, where she developed with her team a system capable of detecting Parkinson's Disease.

In 2015, Katabi presented a startup idea to U.S. President Barack Obama at a White House demo day.

In 2024, Katabi presented her work on AI-powered, contactless health monitoring at the 2025 MIT Women's Conference, showcasing how wireless signals can be used to assess sleep quality, respiration, and gait in home settings, especially for individuals with chronic illnesses. That same year, she was profiled by the U.S. Department of State in its ShareAmerica series, which highlighted her development of artificial intelligence tools to monitor breathing, heart rate, sleep, and movement to aid in the diagnosis and management of conditions such as Parkinson's disease, Alzheimer's disease, Crohn's disease, ALS, and Rett syndrome.

She was also a featured speaker at the 2024 International Congress of Parkinson's Disease and Movement Disorders, where she presented research on the use of artificial intelligence to detect neurodegenerative disease symptoms through passive monitoring of breathing patterns. Her lab continues to develop radio wave–based, contactless sensing devices—resembling Wi-Fi routers—that are capable of tracking a wide range of health conditions, including Alzheimer's disease, atopic dermatitis, autoimmune disorders such as lupus, and other neurodegenerative illnesses like ALS.

As of 2024, Katabi holds the Thuan and Nicole Pham Professorship at the Massachusetts Institute of Technology (MIT), and serves as director of the MIT Center for Wireless Networks and Mobile Computing. Her research focuses on the intersection of AI, wireless sensing, and medical diagnostics.

In 2025, her research group published a study demonstrating that a neural network could detect Parkinson's disease using breathing data collected during sleep. The study, which analyzed data from more than 7,600 individuals, showed that the model could accurately distinguish individuals with Parkinson's disease from healthy participants, and could further estimate disease severity and monitor progression over time—offering a non-invasive tool for both clinical use and remote care.

== Awards and recognitions ==
In 2013, Katabi received the Association for Computing Machinery's Grace Murray Hopper Award, recognizing her as an outstanding young computer science professional.

In 2012, her work on sparse Fourier transforms was chosen as one of the top 10 breakthroughs of the year by MIT Technology Review.

In September 2013, Katabi was awarded a MacArthur Fellowship for her work. In 2013 she also became a fellow of the Association for Computing Machinery.

In 2014, on the celebration of Project Mac's 50th anniversary, her work on X-ray vision was chosen as one of the "50 ways that MIT has transformed computer science."

In 2017, she was elected a member of the National Academy of Engineering for contributions to network congestion control and to wireless communications. In the same year, Katabi received the ACM Prize in Computing for her groundbreaking contributions to wireless networking. The Association for Computing Machinery recognized her as “one of the most innovative researchers in the field of networking,” noting her integration of communication theory, signal processing, and machine learning to address challenges in wireless systems.

In 2022, she was elected a member of the American Academy of Arts and Sciences.

In 2023, Katabi was elected to the National Academy of Sciences, and received an Honorary Doctorate in Humane Letters from the American University of Beirut in recognition of her significant contributions to research and innovation in wireless networks.

In 2025, she was elected a member of the National Academy of Medicine.

Katabi received the 2026 IEEE Koji Kobayashi Computers and Communications Award, "for creative contributions to wireless and network communication, which led to impact on multiple subfields, including wireless sensing".
