= Sanjeev Arora (computer scientist) =

Theoretical computer scientist

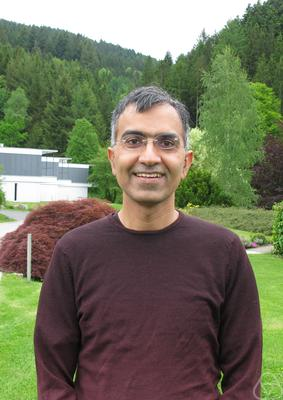
- Arora at Oberwolfach, 2010
- Born: January 1968 (age 58); Jodhpur, Rajasthan, India
- Citizenship: United States
- Education: SB: Massachusetts Institute of Technology; PhD: UC Berkeley
- Known for: Probabilistically checkable proofs PCP theorem
- Scientific career
- Fields: Theoretical computer science
- Workplaces: Princeton University
- Thesis: Probabilistic checking of proofs and the hardness of approximation problems. (1994)
- Doctoral advisor: Umesh Vazirani
- Doctoral students: Subhash Khot, Elad Hazan, Rong Ge

Sanjeev Arora (born January 1968) is an Indian-American theoretical computer scientist who works in AI and machine learning. He is a Charles C. Fitzmorris Professor in Computer Science at Princeton University.

== Career ==
He was a visiting scholar at the Institute for Advanced Study in 2002–03.

In 2008 he was inducted as a Fellow of the Association for Computing Machinery. In 2011 he was awarded the ACM Infosys Foundation Award (now renamed ACM Prize in Computing), given to mid-career researchers in Computer Science. He is a two-time recipient of the Gödel Prize (2001 & 2010). Arora has been awarded the Fulkerson Prize for 2012 for his work on improving the approximation ratio for graph separators and related problems from $O(\log n)$ to $O(\sqrt{\log n})$ (jointly with Satish Rao and Umesh Vazirani). In 2012 he became a Simons Investigator. Arora was elected in 2015 to the American Academy of Arts and Sciences and in 2018 to the National Academy of Sciences. He was a plenary speaker at the 2018 International Congress of Mathematicians.

He is a coauthor (with Boaz Barak) of the book Computational Complexity: A Modern Approach. He was a founder of Princeton's Center for Computational Intractability. He and his coauthors have argued that certain financial products are associated with computational asymmetry, which under certain conditions may lead to market instability.

Since September 2023, he is the founding Director of Princeton Language and Intelligence, a new unit at Princeton University devoted to study of large AI models and their applications.

== Awards and Honors ==
Sanjeev Arora, the Charles C. Fitzmorris Professor in Computer Science at Princeton University, has received numerous prestigious awards.

#	Awards/Honors	Year(s)
1	30-year Test of Time Award for FOCS 1993	2023
2	Bell Labs Innovation Prize	2020
3	Plenary Speaker, International Congress of Mathematicians	2018
4	Inducted as Member, National Academy of Sciences	2018
5	Elected to American Academy of Arts and Sciences	2015
6	Simons Investigator	2012-2022
7	AMS-MOS D.R. Fulkerson Prize	2012
8	ACM Prize in Computing (formerly known as ACM-Infosys Foundation Award in the Computing Sciences)	2011
9	Best Paper, IEEE Foundations of Computer Science	2010
10	George Pólya Prize	2010
11	EATCS-SIGACT Gödel Prize	2010, 2001
12	Elected ACM Fellow	2009
13	Engineering Council Teaching Award, Princeton University	Fall 2008
14	Graduate Mentoring Award, Princeton University	2005
15	Best Paper, ACM Symposium on Theory of Computing	2004
16	Semiplenary speaker, International Symposium on Mathematical Programming	2003
17	Distinguished Alumnus Award, UC Berkeley Computer Science	2003
18	Invited speaker, Mathematical Aspects of Computer Science session, International Congress of Mathematicians	2002
19	Plenary speaker, ACM Symposium on Theory of Computing	1998
20	David and Lucile Packard Foundation Fellowship	1997-2002
21	Alfred P. Sloan Fellowship	1996
22	NSF CAREER Award	1995
23	ACM Doctoral Dissertation Award (cowinner)	1995
24	IBM Graduate Fellowship	1993
25	Ranked first in India, IIT Joint Entrance Exam	1986

== Books ==
- Arora, Sanjeev; Barak, Boaz (2009). Computational complexity: a modern approach. Cambridge University Press. ISBN 978-0-521-42426-4. OCLC 286431654.
