= SFINKS =

Sfinks (Polish for "Sphynx") was also the initial name of the Janusz A. Zajdel Award

In cryptography, SFINKS is a stream cypher algorithm developed by An Braeken, Joseph Lano, Nele Mentens, Bart Preneel, and Ingrid Verbauwhede. It includes a message authentication code. It has been submitted to the eSTREAM Project of the eCRYPT network. In 2005, Nicolas T. Courtois noted that, while the cipher is elegant and secure against some simple algebraic attacks, it is vulnerable to more elaborate known attacks.
