= DECIM =

Cipher Protocol

In cryptography, DECIM is a stream cypher algorithm designed by Come Berbain, Olivier Billet, Anne Canteaut, Nicolas Courtois, Blandine Debraize, Henri Gilbert, Louis Goubin, Aline Gouget, Louis Granboulan, Cédric Lauradoux, Marine Minier, Thomas Pornin and Hervé Sibert.

DECIM algorithm was partly patented but its authors wished for it to remain freely available. It has been submitted to the eSTREAM Project of the eCRYPT network.

== History ==
DECIM was announced in 2005. In 2006 two flaws were identified which could leave the encrypted ciphertext vulnerable to attack. A revised version of cipher, DECIM v2, as well as a 128-bit security version were developed, both proving vulnerable to attack.
