= Hermes8 =

In cryptography, Hermes8 is the name of a stream cipher designed by Ulrich Kaiser. It has been submitted to the eSTREAM Project of the eCRYPT network. It has been classified as an 'archive' algorithm and will not be further considered.

== Security ==
In the paper "An Analysis of the Hermes8 Stream Ciphers" the authors claim, 'an attack on the latest version of the cipher (Hermes8F), which requires very few known keystream bytes and recovers the cipher's secret key in less than a second on a normal PC'.
