= SOSEMANUK =

Stream cipher

Sosemanuk is a stream cipher developed by Come Berbain, Olivier Billet, Anne Canteaut, Nicolas Courtois, Henri Gilbert, Louis Goubin, Aline Gouget, Louis Granboulan, Cédric Lauradoux, Marine Minier, Thomas Pornin and Hervé Sibert. Along with HC-128, Rabbit, and Salsa20/12, Sosemanuk is one of the final four Profile 1 (software) ciphers selected for the eSTREAM Portfolio.

According to the authors, the structure of the cipher is influenced by the stream cipher SNOW and the block cipher Serpent. The cipher has an improved performance compared with Snow, more specifically by having a faster initialization phase. The cipher key length can vary between 128 and 256 bits, but the guaranteed security is only 128 bits. The cipher uses an initialization vector of 128 bits. Of note, during the eSTREAM Phase 1 evaluation process, it was shown that a theoretical attack with cost 2^{224} could be applied, which does not contradict the security claim of "128 bits".

Sosemanuk is not patented and is "free for any use". The name means "snow snake" in the Cree Indian language because it depends both on Snow and Serpent.
