= F-FCSR =

Stream cipher

In cryptography, F-FCSR is a stream cipher developed by Thierry Berger, François Arnault, and Cédric Lauradoux. The core of the cipher is a Feedback with Carry Shift Register (FCSR) automaton, which is similar to a LFSR, but they perform operations with carries so their transition function is nonlinear.

F-FCSR was one of the eight algorithms selected for the eCRYPT network's eSTREAM Portfolio, but it was later removed because further analysis showed weaknesses.
