= Frogbit (cipher) =

Stream cipher algorithm

In cryptography, Frogbit is a stream cypher algorithm developed by Thierry Moreau and is patented. It includes a message authentication code feature. It has been submitted to the eSTREAM Project of the eCRYPT network. It has not been selected as a focus algorithm nor for Phase 2; it has been 'archived'.
