= Makoto Matsumoto =

Makoto Matsumoto is a Japanese name. It may refer to:

- Tomohiro Matsu, a light novelist who has published manga under the pseudonym “Makoto Matsumoto”.
- Makoto Matsumoto (mathematician), the inventor of the Mersenne Twister pseudorandom number generator.
