= NLS (cipher) =

Stream cipher algorithm

In cryptography, NLS is a stream cipher algorithm designed by Gregory Rose, Philip Hawkes, Michael Paddon, and Miriam Wiggers de Vries. It has been submitted to the eSTREAM Project of the eCRYPT network.
