= CJCSG =

Stream cipher algorithm

In cryptography, Cascade Jump Controlled Sequence Generator (CJCSG) is a stream cypher algorithm developed by Cees Jansen, Tor Helleseth, and Alexander Kholosha. It has been submitted to the eSTREAM Project of the eCRYPT network. It has been classified as an archival algorithm and will not be further considered.
