= Polar Bear (cipher) =

Stream cipher algorithm

In cryptography, Polar Bear is a stream cypher algorithm designed by Johan Håstad and Mats Näslund. It has been submitted to the eSTREAM Project of the eCRYPT network.
