= TRBDK3 YAEA =

Stream cipher algorithm

In cryptography, TRBDK3 YAEA is a stream cypher algorithm developed by Timothy Brigham. It has been submitted to the eSTREAM Project of the eCRYPT network. It has not been selected for focus nor for consideration during Phase 2; it has been 'archived'.
