= DICING =

Stream cipher algorithm

In cryptography, DICING is a stream cypher algorithm developed by Li An-Ping. It has been submitted to the eSTREAM project of the eCRYPT network.

DICING is characterized as a synchronous stream cipher that utilizes a clock-controlled mechanism with innovative steps for altering its operations. The design emphasizes efficiency, reportedly achieving performance that is approximately twice as fast as the Advanced Encryption Standard (AES) (Li, 2006). DICING supports key sizes of 128 bits and 256 bits, with no known vulnerabilities against existing cryptographic attacks such as correlation, algebraic, or distinguishing attacks (Wang & Zhang, 2010).
