= SSS (cipher) =

Stream cypher algorithm

In cryptography, SSS is a stream cypher algorithm developed by Gregory Rose, Philip Hawkes, Michael Paddon, and Miriam Wiggers de Vries. It includes a message authentication code feature. It has been submitted to the eSTREAM Project of the eCRYPT network. It has not selected for focus nor for consideration during Phase 2; it has been 'archived'.
