= Achterbahn =

Achterbahn is German for rollercoaster.

It may also refer to:

- Achterbahn (song), by German singer Helene Fischer 2017
- Achterbahn (opera), German premiere version 2011 of the opera Miss Fortune by Judith Weir
- Achterbahn, 2014 German album by Wise Guys (band)
- Achterbahn (stream cipher)
