= WG =

WG may refer to:

== In arts and entertainment ==
- W&G Records, an Australian recording company
- Will & Grace, a television series
- Wonder Girls, a South Korean girl group

== Businesses ==
- W. G. Bagnall, a locomotive manufacturer in Stafford, England
- Sunwing Airlines (IATA code WG)
- Westminster Group, an international security group listed on London Stock Exchange
- Wargaming.net (or just Wargaming), a video game designer

== People ==
- W. G. Grace, English cricketer
- W. G. Sebald (1944–2001), a German writer
- W. G. Snuffy Walden (born 1950), a musician and composer
- Whoopi Goldberg (born 1955), American actor, comedian and moderator of The View (2007–present)

== Places ==
- Grenada (geocode WG)
- West Germany
- Wood Green, an area in North London

== In science and technology ==
- Wegener's granulomatosis, now known as granulomatosis with polyangiitis, is an inflammatory disease that affects blood vessels and organs
- WNT1, a gene formerly known as Wg (wingless)
- In. wg., abbreviation for inches of water gauge, a unit of pressure
- Waveguide
- WireGuard, a simple VPN protocol
- WG (cipher)

== Other uses ==
- Wade–Giles (W–G), a romanization system for the Chinese language
- Where's George?, a currency tracking website
- Working group, an ad hoc group of subject-matter experts
- World Games, a recurrent multi-sport event that complements the Olympics
- WG, alternative name for the Welsh Guards
- The Welsh Government
- WG, in Germany, an apartment rented jointly (abbreviation of Wohngemeinschaft); see co-living or flatshare

== See also ==
- TWG (disambiguation)
