= ABC (stream cipher) =

In cryptography, ABC is a stream cypher algorithm developed by Vladimir Anashin, Andrey Bogdanov, Ilya Kizhvatov, and Sandeep Kumar. It has been submitted to the eSTREAM Project of the eCRYPT network.

It takes a 128-bit key and a 128-bit IV.

The claimed security level of $2^{128}$ bits has been reduced to $2^{88}$.
