= WG (cipher) =

Stream cipher algorithm

In cryptography, WG is a stream cypher algorithm developed by Guang Gong and Yassir Nawaz. It has been submitted to the eSTREAM Project of the eCRYPT network.
