= Anne Canteaut =

French cryptographic researcher

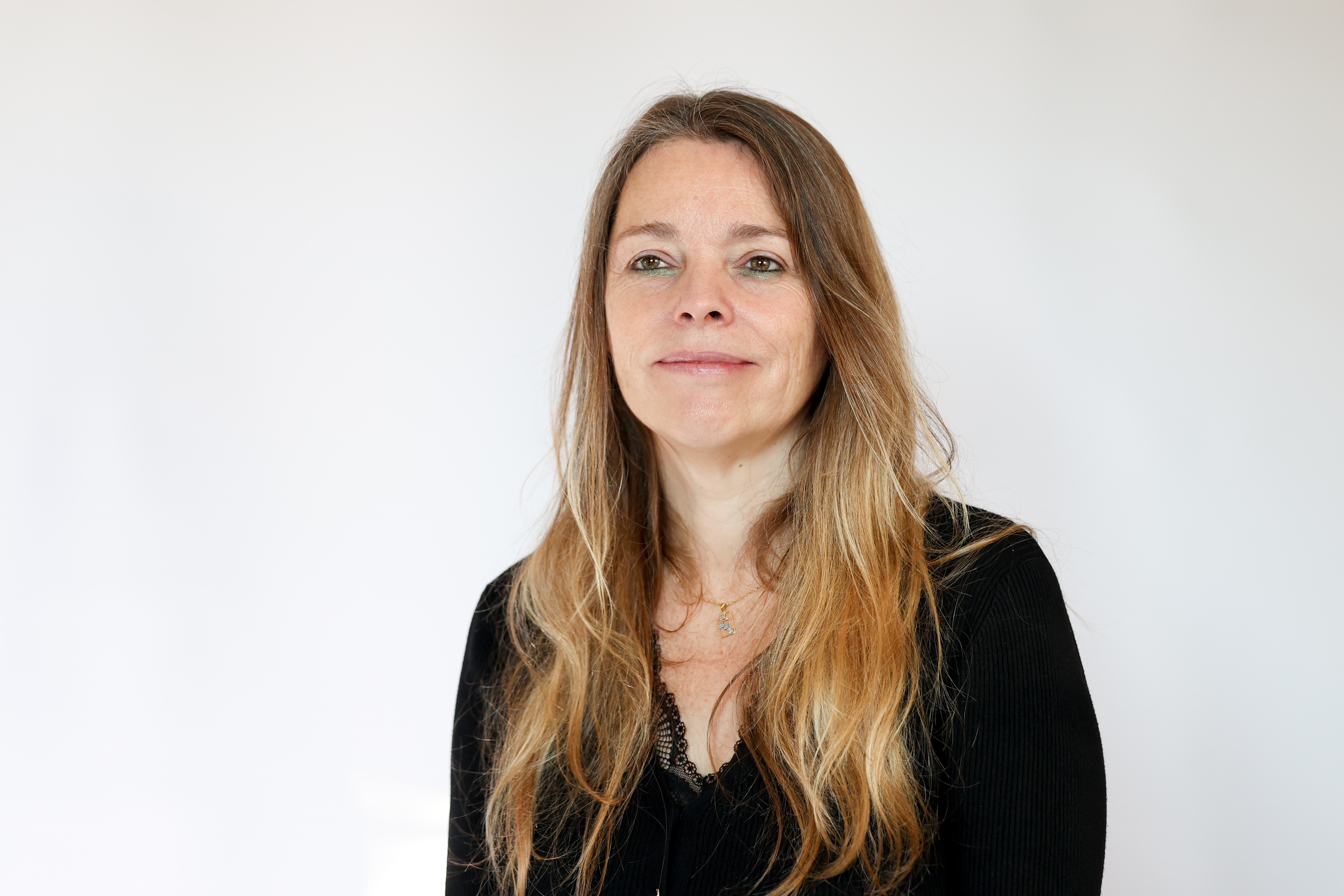
- Education: ENSTA (1993); Paris VI (1996)
- Scientific career
- Fields: Cryptography
- Workplaces: INRIA
- Thesis: Attaques de cryptosystèmes à mots de poids faible et construction de fonctions t-résilientes (1996)
- Doctoral advisor: Paul Camion

Anne Canteaut is a French researcher in cryptography, working at the French Institute for Research in Computer Science and Automation (INRIA) in Paris. She studies the design and cryptanalysis of symmetric-key algorithms and S-boxes.

== Education and career ==
Canteaut earned a diploma in engineering from ENSTA Paris in 1993. She completed her doctorate at Pierre and Marie Curie University in 1996, with the dissertation Attaques de cryptosystèmes à mots de poids faible et construction de fonctions t-résilientes supervised by Paul Camion.

She is currently the chair of the INRIA Evaluation Committee, and of the FSE steering committee. She was the scientific leader of the INRIA team SECRET between 2007 and 2019.

== Cryptographic primitives ==
Canteaut has contributed to the design of several new cryptographic primitives:

- DECIM, a stream cipher submitted to the eSTREAM project
- SOSEMANUK, a stream cipher selected in the eSTREAM portfolio
- Shabal, a hash function submitted to the SHA-3 competition
- Prince, a lightweight block cipher

== Recognition ==
Canteaut was awarded the Legion of Honour in 2019. She became a fellow of the International Association for Cryptologic Research in 2024. She was elected a member of the French Academy of Sciences in 2025.
