= Fubuki =

Fubuki may refer to:

== Fictional characters ==
- Fubuki Shirou, a character in Inazuma Eleven
- Fubuki Kakuyoku, a character in Naruto the Movie
- Fubuki Sakuragasaki, the main character in the anime Arcade Gamer Fubuki
- Fubuki Satō, a character in YuYu Hakusho
- Fubuki Tenjouin or Atticus Rhodes, a character in Yu-Gi-Oh! GX
- Shirakami Fubuki, a virtual YouTuber affiliated with Hololive Production
- Fubuki, a character in One-Punch Man
- Fubuki Nemugaki, a character in Blue Archive

== People ==
- Fubuki Kuno (born 1989), Japanese footballer
- Fubuki Koshiji (1924–1980), Japanese actress and singer
- Fubuki Takane (born 1965), Japanese actress
- Jun Fubuki (born 1952), Japanese actress

== Ships ==
- Fubuki-class destroyer, a class of destroyers of the Imperial Japanese Navy
  - Japanese destroyer Fubuki (1927), a Fubuki-class destroyer of the Imperial Japanese Navy in World War II

== Other uses ==
- Japanese for blizzard
- Fubuki (cipher), a candidate in the eSTREAM cryptography project
- The ending song of the television anime series Kantai Collection
