= Mir-1 =

Stream cipher

In cryptography, Mir-1 is a software-oriented stream cipher algorithm developed by Alexander Maximov. The algorithm was submitted to the eSTREAM project of the eCRYPT network in 2005. Mir-1 is named after the Russian space station Mir.

Mir-1 uses a multiword T-function with four 64-bit words. The data in each word is processed, generating a keystream. Its key size is 128 bits, and its IV is 64 bits.

The designer claimed that Mir-1 had a security level of 2^{128}, i.e., that it could not be "broken" faster than an exhaustive search. At SASC 2006, a successful key-recovery attack on Mir-1 was shown. Maximov did not dispute the attack, and the algorithm was archived after Phase 1 by the eSTREAM committee.
