= Well equidistributed long-period linear =

Family of pseudorandom number generators

The Well Equidistributed Long-period Linear (WELL) is a family of pseudorandom number generators developed in 2006 by François Panneton, Pierre L'Ecuyer, and Makoto Matsumoto (松本 眞). It is a form of linear-feedback shift register optimized for software implementation on a 32-bit machine.

== Operational design ==
The structure is similar to the Mersenne Twister, a large state made up of previous output words (32 bits each), from which a new output word is generated using linear recurrences modulo 2 over a finite binary field $F_2$. However, a more complex recurrence produces a denser generator polynomial, producing better statistical properties.

Each step of the generator reads five words of state: the oldest 32 bits (which may straddle a word boundary if the state size is not a multiple of 32), the newest 32 bits, and three other words in between.

Then a series of eight single-word transformations (mostly of the form $x:= x\oplus(x\gg k)$ and six exclusive-or operations combine those into two words, which become the newest two words of state, one of which will be the output.

== Variants ==
Specific parameters are provided for the following generators:

- WELL512a
- WELL521a, WELL521b
- WELL607a, WELL607b
- WELL800a, WELL800b
- WELL1024a, WELL1024b
- WELL19937a, WELL19937b, WELL19937c
- WELL21701a
- WELL23209a, WELL23209b
- WELL44497a, WELL44497b.

Numbers give the state size in bits; letter suffixes denote variants of the same size.

== Implementations ==
- Implementations of WELL512a, WELL1024a, WELL19937a, WELL19937c, WELL44497a, WELL44497b in C (Free for non-commercial use)
- Implementations of same algorithms in Scala
- Implementations in C++
- Implementations of WELL512, WELL1024, WELL607 in Java
- Implementations of WELL512, WELL1024 in BBC BASIC
- Modified "maximally equidistributed" implementations of WELL19937, WELL44497 in C (Free for non-commercial use)
- Implementation of WELL512 in C (Public Domain)
