= TSC-3 =

In cryptography, TSC-3 is a stream cypher algorithm developed by Jin Hong, Dong Hoon Lee, Yongjin Yeom, Daewan Han, and Seongtaek Chee. It has been submitted to the eSTREAM Project of the eCRYPT network.
