= TWG =

TWG may refer to:

- Trans-World Group, association of commodities traders controlling stakes in most of Russia's aluminum smelters
- TWG Global, American multinational conglomerate holding company
- TWG Tea, Singaporean tea brand
- The Warehouse Group, New Zealand retail company
- The Wireless Group, broadcasting and new media company based in Belfast, Northern Ireland
- The Wollongong Group, American software company
- The World Games, a recurrent multi-sport event that complements the Olympics
- Tereweng language (ISO 639-3: twg), a language of Papua New Guinea

== See also ==
- WG (disambiguation)
