= HC-256 =

Stream cipher

HC-256 is a stream cipher designed to provide bulk encryption in software at high speeds while permitting strong confidence in its security. A 128-bit variant was submitted as an eSTREAM cipher candidate and has been selected as one of the four final contestants in the software profile.

The algorithm is designed by Hongjun Wu, and was first published in 2004. It is not patented.

== Function ==
HC-256 has a 256 bit key and an initialization vector (nonce) of 256 bits.

Internally, it consists of two secret tables (P and Q). Each table contains 1024 32-bit words. For each state update one 32-bit word in each table is updated using a non-linear update function. After 2048 steps all elements of the tables have been updated.

It generates one 32-bit word for each update step using a 32-bit to 32-bit mapping function similar to the output function of the Blowfish cipher. Finally a linear bit-masking function is applied to generate an output word. It uses the two message schedule functions in the hash function SHA-256 internally, but with the tables P and Q as S-boxes.

HC-128 is similar in function, and reduces each of key length, nonce, number of words in the tables P and Q, and number of table updating steps by half.

== Performance ==
The performance of HC-256 is estimated by its author to be about 4 cycles per byte on a Pentium 4 processor. However the initialization phase of the cipher includes expanding the 256-bit key into the tables P, Q and then running the cipher for 4096 steps. The author of HC-256 estimates this process to take around 74,000 cycles.

For HC-128 an encryption speed of about 3 cycles per byte on a Pentium M processor are cited.

The implementation of HC-128 on various computing structures is studied in detail, with significant performance gains compared to naive SW implementation.
