= Trivium (cipher) =

Stream cipher

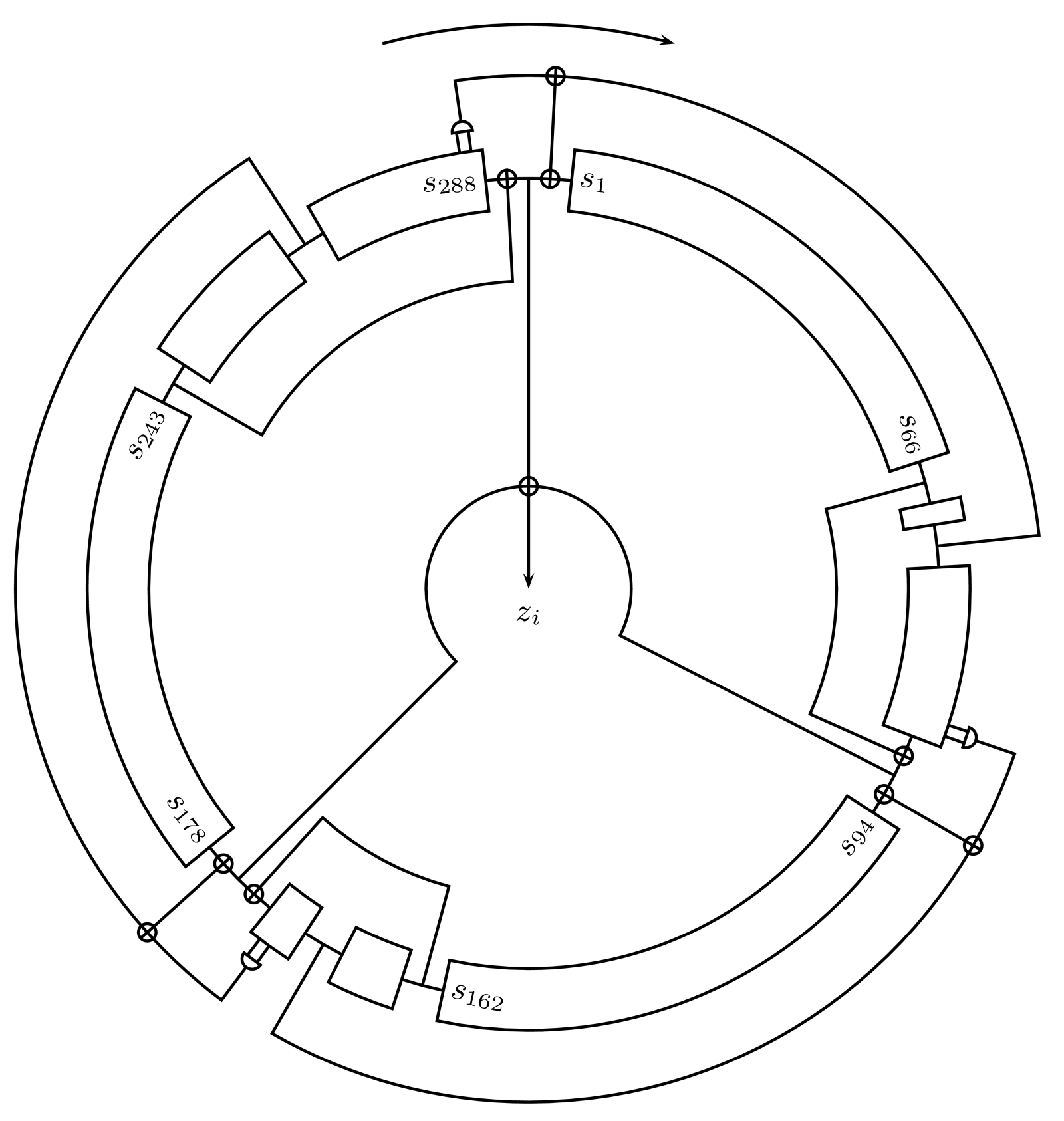
Structure of Trivium

Trivium is a synchronous stream cipher designed to provide a flexible trade-off between speed and gate count in hardware, and reasonably efficient software implementation.

Trivium was submitted to the Profile II (hardware) of the eSTREAM competition by its authors, Christophe De Cannière and Bart Preneel, and has been selected as part of the portfolio for low area hardware ciphers (Profile 2) by the eSTREAM project. It is not patented and has been specified as an International Standard under ISO/IEC 29192-3.

It generates up to 2^{64} bits of output from an 80-bit key and an 80-bit IV. It is the simplest eSTREAM entrant; while it shows remarkable resistance to cryptanalysis for its simplicity and performance, recent attacks leave the security margin looking rather slim.

== Description ==
Trivium's 288-bit internal state consists of three shift registers of different lengths. At each round, a bit is shifted into each of the three shift registers using a non-linear combination of taps from that and one other register; one bit of output is produced. To initialize the cipher, the key and IV are written into two of the shift registers, with the remaining bits starting in a fixed pattern; the cipher state is then updated 4 × 288 = 1152 times, so that every bit of the internal state depends on every bit of the key and of the IV in a complex nonlinear way.

No taps appear on the first 65 bits of each shift register, so each novel state bit is not used until at least 65 rounds after it is generated. This is the key to Trivium's software performance and flexibility in hardware.

== Specification ==
Trivium may be specified very concisely using three recursive equations. Each variable is an element of GF(2); they can be represented as bits, with "+" being XOR and "•" being AND.

- a_{i} = c_{i−66} + c_{i−111} + c_{i−110} • c_{i−109} + a_{i−69}
- b_{i} = a_{i−66} + a_{i−93} + a_{i−92} • a_{i−91} + b_{i−78}
- c_{i} = b_{i−69} + b_{i−84} + b_{i−83} • b_{i−82} + c_{i−87}

The output bits r_{0} ... r_{2^{64}−1} are then generated by

- r_{i} = c_{i−66} + c_{i−111} + a_{i−66} + a_{i−93} + b_{i−69} + b_{i−84}

Given an 80-bit key k_{0} ... k_{79} and an l-bit IV v_{0} ... v_{l−1} (where 0 ≤ l < 80), Trivium is initialized as follows:

- (a_{−1245} ... a_{−1153}) = (0, 0 ... 0, k_{0} ... k_{79})
- (b_{−1236} ... b_{−1153}) = (0, 0 ... 0, v_{0} ... v_{l−1})
- (c_{−1263} ... c_{−1153}) = (1, 1, 1, 0, 0 ... 0)

The large negative indices on the initial values reflect the 1152 steps that must take place before output is produced.

To map a stream of bits r to a stream of bytes R, we use the LSb-first mapping R_{i} = Σ_{j=0, ..., 7} 2^{j} r_{8i+j}.

== Performance ==
A straightforward hardware implementation of Trivium would use 3488 logic gates and produce one bit per clock cycle. However, because each state bit is not used for at least 64 rounds, 64 state bits can be generated in parallel at a higher hardware cost of 5504 gates. Different tradeoffs between speed and area are also possible.

The same property allows an efficient bitslice implementation in software; performance testing by eSTREAM give bulk encryption speeds of around 4 cycles/byte on some x86 platforms, which compares well to the 19 cycles/byte of the AES reference implementation on the same platform.

== Security ==
[Trivium] was designed as an exercise in exploring how far a stream cipher can be simplified without sacrificing its security, speed or flexibility. While simple designs are more likely to be vulnerable to simple, and possibly devastating, attacks (which is why we strongly discourage the use of Trivium at this stage), they certainly inspire more confidence than complex schemes, if they survive a long period of public scrutiny despite their simplicity.

As of 2025, no cryptanalytic attacks better than brute-force attack are known, but several attacks come close. The best published practical cube attacks recover the key of reduced-round Trivium with up to 832 of its 1,152 initialization rounds, with a reported time complexity not exceeding (2^{50}). Attacks reaching 978 rounds for key recovery and 1,108 rounds for distinguishing apply only in a weak-key setting; no comparable attack is known against the full cipher.

Previous cube attacks required 2^{68} steps to break a variant of Trivium where the number of initialization rounds is reduced to 799. Other authors speculated that these techniques could lead to a break for 1100 initialisation rounds, or "maybe even the original cipher". This builds on an attack due to Michael Vielhaber that breaks 576 initialization rounds in only 2^{12.3} steps.

Another attack recovers the internal state (and thus the key) of the full cipher in around 2^{89.5} steps (where each step is roughly the cost of a single trial in exhaustive search). Reduced variants of Trivium using the same design principles have been broken using an equation-solving technique. These attacks improve on the well-known time-space tradeoff attack on stream ciphers, which with Trivium's 288-bit internal state would take 2^{144} steps, and show that a variant on Trivium which made no change except to increase the key length beyond the 80 bits mandated by eSTREAM Profile 2 would not be secure. Using optimised solving strategy, it is further possible to reduce the state-recovery complexity to 2^{132} steps.

A detailed justification of the design of Trivium is given in a paper "A Stream Cipher Construction Inspired by Block Cipher Design Principles".
