= CryptMT =

Stream cipher

In cryptography, CryptMT is a stream cipher algorithm which internally uses the Mersenne twister. It was developed by Makoto Matsumoto, Mariko Hagita, Takuji Nishimura and Mutsuo Saito and is patented. It was one of the final Phase 3 candidates in the eSTREAM project of the eCRYPT network but was not selected because the non-linear filter component was not as well-understood in terms of its security.

In that submission to eSTREAM, the authors also included another cipher named Fubuki, which also uses the Mersenne twister.
