= Bart Preneel =

Belgian cryptographer (born 1963)

- Born: 15 October 1963 (age 62); Leuven, Belgium
- Education: Katholieke Universiteit Leuven
- Known for: Hash Functions cryptanalysis RIPEMD; Miyaguchi-Preneel scheme
- Scientific career
- Fields: Cryptography
- Workplaces: Katholieke Universiteit Leuven; University of California at Berkeley
- Doctoral advisor: Joos Vandewalle; René Govaerts
- Website: http://homes.esat.kuleuven.be/~preneel/

Bart Preneel (born 15 October 1963 in Leuven, Belgium) is a Belgian cryptographer and cryptanalyst. He is a professor at Katholieke Universiteit Leuven, in the COSIC group.

He was the president of the International Association for Cryptologic Research in 2008–2013 and project manager of ECRYPT.

== Education ==
In 1987, Preneel received a degree in Electrical Engineering from the Katholieke Universiteit Leuven.

In 1993, Preneel received a PhD in Applied Sciences from the Katholieke Universiteit Leuven. His dissertation in computer science, entitled Analysis and Design of Cryptographic Hash Functions, was advised by Joos (Joseph) P. L. Vandewalle and René J. M. Govaerts.

== Career ==
Along with Shoji Miyaguchi, he independently invented the Miyaguchi–Preneel scheme, a structure that converts a block cipher into a hash function, used e.g. in the hash function Whirlpool. He is one of the authors of the RIPEMD-160 hash function. He was also a co-inventor of the stream cipher MUGI which would later become a Japanese standard, and of the stream cipher Trivium which was a well-received entrant to the eSTREAM project.

He has also contributed to the cryptanalysis of RC4, SOBER-t32, MacGuffin, Helix, Phelix, Py, TPypy, the HAVAL cryptographic hash function, and the SecurID hash function.
