= Makoto Matsumoto (mathematician) =

Japanese mathematician and inventor of the Mersenne Twister

Makoto Matsumoto (松本眞, born February 18, 1965) is a Japanese mathematician principally known as the inventor of the Mersenne Twister, a widely used pseudorandom number generator. He is also the author of the CryptMT stream cipher.

== Career ==
In January 1998, while an associate professor at Keio University, he invented the Mersenne Twister along with Takuji Nishimura. Two years later, he completed his Ph.D. on random number generators.

Until his retirement in August 2023, he was a professor at the Department of Mathematics, Graduate School of Science, Hiroshima University.

== Awards ==
- Kirkman Medal - 1997
- IBM Japan Science Prize - 1999
- Japan Society for the Promotion of Science - 2008
