= Nicolas Courtois =

French and British cryptographer (born 1971)

Nicolas Tadeusz Courtois
- Born: November 14, 1971 (age 55); Lębork
- Citizenship: French
- Education: University of Paris VI: Pierre et Marie Curie
- Known for: Cryptography, security
- Scientific career
- Fields: Computer science
- Workplaces: University College London

Nicolas Tadeusz Courtois (born 14 November 1971) is a cryptographer. He was formerly senior lecturer in computer science at University College London.

Courtois was one of the co-authors of both the XSL attack against block ciphers, such as the Advanced Encryption Standard, and the XL system for solving systems of algebraic equations used in the attack. Other cryptographic results of Courtois include algebraic attacks on stream ciphers, attacks on the KeeLoq and Hitag 2 systems used for remote keyless automobile entry systems, and an analysis of cryptographic weaknesses in public transit smart cards including the London Underground Oyster card and the Dutch OV-chipkaart. More recently, he has written about cryptocurrency.

Courtois graduated from University of Paris VI: Pierre et Marie Curie, where he received his doctoral degree in cryptography.
