= Keystream =

Concept in cryptography

In cryptography, a keystream is a stream of random or pseudorandom characters that are combined with a plaintext message to produce an encrypted message (the ciphertext).

The "characters" in the keystream can be bits, bytes, numbers or actual characters like A-Z depending on the usage case.

Usually each character in the keystream is either added, subtracted or XORed with a character in the plaintext to produce the ciphertext, using modular arithmetic.

Keystreams are used in the one-time pad cipher and in most stream ciphers. Block ciphers can also be used to produce keystreams. For instance, CTR mode is a block mode that makes a block cipher produce a keystream and thus turns the block cipher into a stream cipher.

== Example ==
In this simple example we use the English alphabet of 26 characters from a-z. Thus we can not encrypt numbers, commas, spaces and other symbols. The random numbers in the keystream then have to be at least between 0 and 25.

To encrypt we add the keystream numbers to the plaintext. And to decrypt we subtract the same keystream numbers from the ciphertext to get the plaintext.

If a ciphertext number becomes larger than 25 we wrap it to a value between 0-25. Thus 26 becomes 0 and 27 becomes 1 and so on. (Such wrapping is called modular arithmetic.)

Here the plaintext message "attack at dawn" is combined by addition with the keystream "kjcngmlhylyu" and produces the ciphertext "kcvniwlabluh".

Plaintext	a	t	t	a	c	k	a	t	d	a	w	n
Plaintext as numbers	0	19	19	0	2	10	0	19	3	0	22	13
Keystream	k	j	c	n	g	m	l	h	y	l	y	u
Keystream as numbers	10	9	2	13	6	12	11	7	24	11	24	20
Ciphertext as numbers	10	28	21	13	8	22	11	26	27	11	46	33
Ciphertext as numbers wrapped to 0-25	10	2	21	13	8	22	11	0	1	11	20	7
Ciphertext as text	k	c	v	n	i	w	l	a	b	l	u	h
