= Moni Naor =

Israeli computer scientist (born 1961)

- מוני נאור
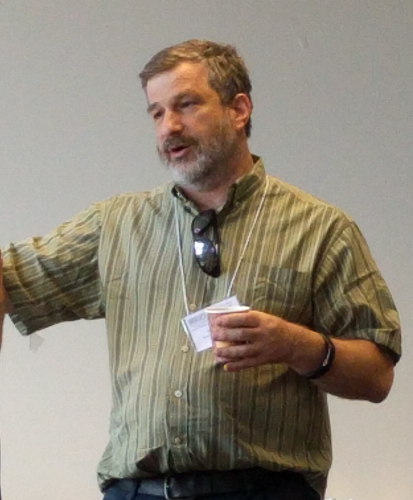
- Moni Naor at the DIMACS Workshop on Cryptography, July 2016.
- Born: 1961 (age 64–65)
- Citizenship: Israeli
- Education: Technion; University of California, Berkeley
- Awards: Gödel Prize (2014); Paris Kanellakis Award (2016)
- Scientific career
- Fields: Computer Science, Cryptography
- Workplaces: Weizmann Institute of Science
- Doctoral advisor: Manuel Blum
- Doctoral students: Yehuda Lindell; Omer Reingold; Kobbi Nissim

Moni Naor (Hebrew: מוני נאור) is an Israeli computer scientist, currently a professor at the Weizmann Institute of Science. Naor received his Ph.D. in 1989 at the University of California, Berkeley. His advisor was Manuel Blum.

He works in various fields of computer science, mainly the foundations of cryptography. He is notable for initiating research on public key systems secure against chosen ciphertext attack and creating non-malleable cryptography, visual cryptography (with Adi Shamir), and suggesting various methods for verifying that users of a computer system are human (leading to the notion of CAPTCHA). His research on Small-bias sample space, give a general framework for combining small k-wise independent spaces with small $\epsilon$-biased spaces to obtain $\delta$-almost k-wise independent spaces of small size. In 1994 he was the first, with Amos Fiat, to formally study the problem of practical broadcast encryption. Along with Benny Chor, Amos Fiat, and Benny Pinkas, he made a contribution to the development of Traitor tracing, a copyright infringement detection system which works by tracing the source of leaked files rather than by direct copy protection.

== Bibliography ==
- Cynthia Dwork, Jeff Lotspiech and Moni Naor, Digital Signets: Self-Enforcing Protection of Digital Information.
- Dalit Naor, Moni Naor and Jeff Lotspiech, Revocation and Tracing Schemes for Stateless Receivers.
- David Chaum, Amos Fiat and Moni Naor, Untraceable Electronic Cash, 1990.
- Amos Fiat and Moni Naor, Implicit O(1) Probe Search, SIAM J. Computing 22: 1-10 (1993).
- Amos Fiat and Moni Naor, Broadcast Encryption, 1994.
- Moni Naor and Benny Pinkas, Threshold Traitor Tracing, Crypto 98.
- Moni Naor and Benny Pinkas, Efficient Trace and Revoke Schemes, FC'2000.
- Benny Chor, Amos Fiat, Moni Naor and Benny Pinkas, Tracing Traitors, IEEE Transactions on Information Theory, Vol. 46(3), pp. 893–910, 2000.

== Honors and awards ==
- 2008: Named an IACR fellow
- 2014: The Gödel Prize (with co-authors)
- 2016: The Paris Kanellakis Theory and Practice Award of the Association for Computing Machinery (with Amos Fiat)
- 2022: The 30-year Test-of-Time STOC Award for his 1991 STOC paper “Non-Malleable Cryptography” (with Cynthia Dwork and Danny Dolev)
- 2022: RSA Award for Excellence in Mathematics (with Cynthia Dwork)
- 2024: Rothschild Prize in Computer Science for 2024

== Sources ==
- Moni Naor's website at the Weizmann Institute
- Verification of a human in the loop or Identification via the Turing Test
- Visual Cryptography
- Moni Naor at the Mathematics Genealogy Project
- IACR fellow 2008 announcement
