= Rivest (surname) =

Rivest is a surname. Notable people with the surname include:

- Chris Rivest, American entrepreneur
- Jean-Claude Rivest (born 1943), Canadian lawyer and politician
- Jesse Rivest (born 1977), Canadian singer-songwriter
- Patrick Rivest-Bunster (born 1986), Canadian recurve archer
- Ron Rivest (born 1947), American cryptographer and professor
