= Amos Fiat =

Israeli computer scientist

- עמוס פיאט
- Born: December 1, 1956 (age 69); Haifa, Israel
- Education: Weizmann Institute of Science; University of California, Berkeley; Tel Aviv University
- Scientific career
- Fields: Computer science Cryptography
- Workplaces: Tel Aviv University
- Doctoral advisor: Adi Shamir; Richard Karp; Manuel Blum

Amos Fiat (Hebrew: עמוס פיאט; born December 1, 1956) is an Israeli computer scientist, a professor of computer science at Tel Aviv University. He is known for his work in cryptography, online algorithms, and algorithmic game theory.

== Biography ==
Fiat earned his Ph.D. in 1987 from the Weizmann Institute of Science under the supervision of Adi Shamir. After postdoctoral studies with Richard Karp and Manuel Blum at the University of California, Berkeley, he returned to Israel, taking a faculty position at Tel Aviv University.

== Research ==
Many of Fiat's most highly cited publications concern cryptography, including his work with Adi Shamir on digital signatures (leading to the Fiat–Shamir heuristic for turning interactive identification protocols into signature schemes) and his work with David Chaum and Moni Naor on electronic money, used as the basis for the ecash system. With Shamir and Uriel Feige in 1988, Fiat invented the Feige–Fiat–Shamir identification scheme, a method for using public-key cryptography to provide challenge–response authentication.

In 1994, he was one of the first, with Moni Naor, to formally study the problem of practical broadcast encryption. Along with Benny Chor, Moni Naor and Benny Pinkas, he made a contribution to the development of Traitor tracing, a copyright infringement detection system which works by tracing the source of leaked files rather than by direct copy protection.

With Gerhard Woeginger, Fiat organized a series of Dagstuhl workshops on competitive analysis of online algorithms, and together with Woeginger he edited the book Online Algorithms: The State of the Art (Lecture Notes in Computer Science 1442, Springer-Verlag, 1998). His research papers include methods for applying competitive analysis to paging, call control, data management, and the assignment of files to servers in distributed file systems.

Fiat's interest in game theory stretches back to his thesis research, which included analysis of the children's game Battleship. He has taken inspiration from the game Tetris in developing new job shop scheduling algorithms, as well as applying competitive analysis to the design of game-theoretic auctions.

== Bibliography ==
- Amos Fiat and Moni Naor, Rigorous Time/Space Tradeoffs for Inverting Functions, SIAM J. Computing 29(3), 1999, pp. 790–803.
- Benny Chor, Amos Fiat, Moni Naor and Benny Pinkas, Tracing Traitors, IEEE Transactions on Information Theory, Vol. 46(3), pp. 893–910, 2000.
- David Chaum, Amos Fiat and Moni Naor, Untraceable Electronic Cash, 1990.
- Amos Fiat and Moni Naor, Broadcast Encryption, 1994.
- Amos Fiat and Moni Naor, Implicit O(1) Probe Search, SIAM J. Computing 22: 1–10 (1993).

== Honours and awards ==
- 2016 (with Moni Naor) Paris Kanellakis Theory and Practice Award of the Association for Computing Machinery
- EATCS Award (2023)
