= Interlock (disambiguation) =

Interlock can refer to the following:

- Ignition interlock device
- Interlock (band), an industrial/alternative metal band
- Interlock (engineering)
- Interlocking (railway signaling)
- Interlock (cinema projection)
- Interlocking tower
- An interlocked hutch in a synchrotron radiation beamline
- Interlock protocol, a cryptographic protocol
- Interlock role-playing system
- Interlocking spur, landsliding occurring in a river's upper course which modifies the river bed pattern
- Mechanically-interlocked molecular architectures in supramolecular chemistry
- Interlock fabric, a double-knitted jersey fabric.
- Interlocking directorate (business)

== Music ==
- Hocket, a musical technique
- Kotekan, a playing style in Balinese Gamelan music
