= Claw-free =

Claw-free may refer to:

- Claw-free graph
- Claw-free permutation
