= TPY =

TPY may refer to:

- First-pass yield, also known as throughput yield
- tons per year, a measure of mass over time
- TPY-2, a type of long-range radar
- TPY-4, a type of long-range radar
- tpy, the ISO code for the Trumai language
- TPy, a proposed variant of Py (cipher)
- TPY, the IATA code for Torino Porta Nuova railway station in Turin, Italy
- tpy, abbreviation for the chemical ligand terpyridine
