= VMPC =

VMPC can stand for:

- Ventromedial prefrontal cortex
- Variably Modified Permutation Composition
