= Bit flipping =

In computing, bit flipping may refer to:

- Bit manipulation, algorithmic manipulation of binary digits (bits)
- Bitwise operation NOT, performing logical negation to a single bit, or each of several bits, switching state 0 to 1, and vice versa
- Memory error or soft error, an unintentional state switch from 0 to 1, or vice versa, of a bit stored to random access memory or other medium
  - Single-event upset, an unintended bit flip due to radiation exposure
- Bit-flipping attack, an attack on encrypted data by flipping bits
