= Broadcast encryption =

Encryption methods for TV programs

Broadcast encryption is the cryptographic problem of delivering encrypted content (e.g. TV programs or data on DVDs) over a broadcast channel in such a way that only qualified users (e.g. subscribers who have paid their fees or DVD players conforming to a specification) can decrypt the content. The challenge arises from the requirement that the set of qualified users can change in each broadcast emission, and therefore revocation of individual users or user groups should be possible using broadcast transmissions, only, and without affecting any remaining users. As efficient revocation is the primary objective of broadcast encryption, solutions are also referred to as revocation schemes.

Rather than directly encrypting the content for qualified users, broadcast encryption schemes distribute keying information that allow qualified users to reconstruct the content encryption key whereas revoked users find insufficient information to recover the key. The typical setting considered is that of a unidirectional broadcaster and stateless users (i.e., users do not keep bookmarking of previous messages by the broadcaster), which is especially challenging. In contrast, the scenario where users are supported with a bi-directional communication link with the broadcaster and thus can more easily maintain their state, and where users are not only dynamically revoked but also added (joined), is often referred to as multicast encryption.

The problem of practical broadcast encryption has first been formally studied by Amos Fiat and Moni Naor in 1994. Since then, several solutions have been described in the literature, including combinatorial constructions, one-time revocation schemes based on secret sharing techniques, and tree-based constructions. In general, they offer various trade-offs between the increase in the size of the broadcast, the number of keys that each user needs to store, and the feasibility of an unqualified user or a collusion of unqualified users being able to decrypt the content. Luby and Staddon have used a combinatorial approach to study the trade-offs for some general classes of broadcast encryption algorithms. A particularly efficient tree-based construction is the "subset difference" scheme, which is derived from a class of so-called subset cover schemes. The subset difference scheme is notably implemented in the AACS for HD DVD and Blu-ray Disc encryption. A rather simple broadcast encryption scheme is used for the CSS for DVD encryption.

The problem of rogue users sharing their decryption keys or the decrypted content with unqualified users is mathematically insoluble. Traitor tracing algorithms aim to minimize the damage by retroactively identifying the user or users who leaked their keys, so that punitive measures, legal or otherwise, may be undertaken. In practice, pay TV systems often employ set-top boxes with tamper-resistant smart cards that impose physical restraints on a user learning their own decryption keys. Some broadcast encryption schemes, such as AACS, also provide tracing capabilities.

== See also ==
- Digital rights management
- Multicast encryption
- Television encryption
- Threshold cryptosystem
