= GMR (cryptography) =

Digital signature algorithm

In cryptography, GMR is a digital signature algorithm named after its inventors Shafi Goldwasser, Silvio Micali and Ron Rivest.

As with RSA the security of the system is related to the difficulty of factoring very large numbers. But, in contrast to RSA, GMR is secure against adaptive chosen-message attacks, which is the currently accepted security definition for signature schemes— even when an attacker receives signatures for messages of his choice, this does not allow them to forge a signature for a single additional message.
