= Sally Goldman =

American computer scientist

Sally Ann Goldman is an American computer scientist specializing in computational learning theory. She was a professor in the Department of Computer Science and Engineering at Washington University in St. Louis, and Edwin H. Murty Professor of Engineering, before leaving academia to join Google Research. She is also a successful amateur powerlifter.

== Education and career ==
Goldman is originally from St. Louis. She majored in computer science at Brown University, and then went to the Massachusetts Institute of Technology (MIT) for graduate study in computer science. She completed her Ph.D. there in 1990, with the dissertation Learning Binary Relations, Total Orders, and Read-Once Formulas supervised by Ron Rivest.

As a faculty member of the McKelvey School of Engineering at Washington University in St. Louis, she became Edwin H. Murty Professor of Engineering before leaving academia in 2008 to work for Google Research.

== Personal life ==
Goldman was married to Kenneth J. Goldman, also a computer scientist from St. Louis with whom she went to Brown and MIT; he also became a faculty member at Washington University and a researcher for Google. He died of cancer in 2020.

After moving to the San Francisco Bay Area to work for Google, Goldman took up amateur powerlifting, and has won her division and weight class in multiple national and world championships held by USA Powerlifting (USAPL), the United States Powerlifting Association (USPA), and the International Powerlifting League (IPL).

== Book ==
Goldman is the coauthor, with Ken Goldman, of an undergraduate textbook, A Practical Guide to Data Structures and Algorithms using Java (CRC Press, 2007).
