= Software independence =

Voting system that doesn't rely solely on software

The term "software independence" (SI) was coined by Dr. Ron Rivest and NIST researcher John Wack. A software independent voting machine is one whose tabulation record does not rely solely on software. The goal of an SI system is to definitively determine whether all votes were recorded legitimately or in error.

The technical definition of SI is:

A voting system is software-independent if an undetected change or error in its software cannot cause an undetectable change or error in an election outcome.

SI has been redefined as a global property for a tabulation of votes rather than of each individual vote, aiming to detect rather than prevent error and fraud through human processes.

== TGDC Resolution ==
The Election Assistance Commission's Technical Guidelines Development Committee adopted an SI resolution for the next iteration of the Voluntary Voting System Guidelines (VVSG):

Election officials and vendors have appropriately responded to the growing complexity of voting systems by adding more stringent access controls, encryption, testing, and physical security to election procedures and systems. The TGDC has considered current threats to voting systems and, at this time, finds that security concerns do not warrant replacing deployed voting systems where EAC Best Practices are used.

To provide auditability and proactively address the increasing difficulty of protecting against all prospective threats, the TGDC directs STS to write requirements for the next version of the VVSG requiring the next generation of voting systems to be software independent. The TGDC directs STS and HFP to draft usability and accessibility requirements to ensure that all voters can verify the independent voting record.

The TGDC further directs STS and Core Requirements and Testing Subcommittees (CRT) to draft requirements to ensure that systems that produce independently verifiable voting records are reliable and provide adequate support for audits.

== Example systems ==
Examples of software-independent voting systems are optical scan voting systems and direct recording electronic voting computers (DRE) with a voter verified paper audit trail.

== See also ==
- Independent verification systems
- Certification of voting machines
