= Algorand =

Blockchain and cryptocurrency

Denominations
- Code: ALGO

Development
- Original author: Silvio Micali
- White paper: arXiv:1607.01341; IACR ePrint 2017/454; IACR ePrint 2018/377
- Initial release: April 2019; 7 years ago
- Code repository: github.com/algorand/go-algorand
- Development status: Active
- Written in: Go
- Developer(s): Algorand Foundation US, Inc.

Ledger
- Ledger start: June 2019

Website
- Website: algorand.co

Algorand is a public blockchain platform that uses a proof-of-stake consensus mechanism and provides smart contract functionality. The platform's native cryptocurrency is ALGO.

== History ==
Algorand was founded in 2017 by Silvio Micali, a professor at the Massachusetts Institute of Technology and co-recipient of the 2012 Turing Award.

Algorand's test network was launched to the public in April 2019.

The main Algorand network was officially launched in June 2019.

On March 17, 2026, the U.S. Securities and Exchange Commission (SEC) and the Commodity Futures Trading Commission (CFTC) jointly issued an interpretive release that identified ALGO as a digital commodity rather than security.

In 2019, Algorand became a partner of World Chess.

In 2021, Italia Olivicola, Italy's largest olive and olive oil producers' organization, partnered with Euranet to implement Algorand-based blockchain technology in an attempt to address olive oil adulteration. SIAE, the Italian Society of Authors and Publishers, also announced a project on copyright management using Algorand in the same year.

In 2022, Algorand's blockchain was used by Robert Irwin and the Australia Zoo for a series of non-fungible tokens (NFTs).

In May 2022, Algorand became FIFA's official blockchain platform and a sponsor of the 2022 FIFA World Cup and the 2023 FIFA Women's World Cup.

In January 2023, Fideiussioni Digitali, Italy's initiative to reduce fraud in bank and insurance guarantees, selected the Algorand blockchain for a project to address fraudulent bank guarantees. In February 2023, the Algorand Foundation urged users to withdraw funds from the cryptocurrency wallet MyAlgo, after it was hacked for $9.6 million the previous week.

In 2024, CNBC-TV18 reported that Algorand's blockchain was being tested for use in a digital identification to help women in India access public health programs.

The first tokenized money market fund on the Algorand blockchain launched in June 2024.

== Design ==
Algorand can only be forked intentionally through soft forks and source code forks.

=== Consensus algorithm ===
Algorand uses a Byzantine agreement protocol based on proof of stake, which contributes to its energy efficiency. A 2021 study estimated the network's total power consumption at 6.2 to 189.3 kW, depending on validator hardware, or roughly 0.2 to 5.3 watt-hours per transaction at then-current throughput. By comparison, it estimated Bitcoin's consumption at over 360 kWh per transaction. Since January 2025, accounts that propose blocks have received block rewards.

The Algorand Foundation funded an article that claims Algorand's overall protocol framework is sound under certain conditions.

=== Cryptographic sortition ===
The core principle of Algorand consensus is the cryptographic "self" sortition. The sortition procedure runs locally and privately on each node of the network participating in the consensus protocol, without centralized coordination. The goal of the sortition algorithm is to randomly select a subset of users participating in the consensus protocol (committees), ensuring two properties: the sortition's result can be easily verified once it is published, while it cannot be determined ahead of time by malicious adversaries. The number of selected users in the sortition (committee size) is defined as a statistical expectation on the outcome of a pseudorandom process. The likelihood that a given user will be selected (in the committee) is influenced by the number of ALGO tokens held by that user (the stake).

=== Consensus steps ===
Algorand's consensus has three steps: block proposal, proposals filtering (soft vote) and committing the block (certify vote).

In the first step, the cryptographic sortition selects a subset of users (proposal committee) who assemble and propose a block for the next round of the protocol. At the end of the step, there are a few block proposals (the protocol is tuned with a statistical expectation of 20 proposals) with different random priorities. After determining whether a user is on the proposal committee, that user can build a proposed block and gossip it to the network for review and analysis during the second phase. The user includes the result of the verifiable random function (VRF), h, and a cryptographic proof, π, in their block proposal to demonstrate committee membership.

In the second step, the nodes in the network wait for a period of time (the filter timeout), measured by nodes' local clocks, to be sure that the block proposals gossiped in the previous step have been observed. Since a 2024 upgrade, this timeout is adjusted dynamically within fixed bounds according to observed network conditions, which reduced the average block time to about 2.8 seconds at the time.

A new cryptographic sortition selects a subset of users (soft vote committee) to vote and reach a Byzantine agreement (called "BA*") on the proposal with the highest priority. When users have determined that they are in this second-phase voting committee, they analyze the block proposals they have received (including verification of first-phase committee membership) and vote on the highest-priority one.

Once a threshold of votes is reached in the previous proposals filtering step, the third and last step of the protocol begins. A new cryptographic sortition selects a subset of users (certify committee) to vote and reach a Byzantine agreement on the content of the proposed block with respect to the state of the ledger (for example, the block does not contain double-spending, overspending or any other invalid state transition between accounts).

If the certify committee achieves consensus on a new block, then the new block is disseminated across the network and appended to the ledger.

=== Recovery ===
The Algorand consensus protocol privileges consistency over availability (CAP theorem). If the network is unable to reach consensus on the next step (or block) within a certain time, the protocol enters a recovery mode, suspending block production to prevent forks (contrary to what would happen in blockchains based on the "longest-chain principle", such as Bitcoin). According to the protocol's designers, block production resumes once the network is again sufficiently synchronous, and blocks that have reached final consensus are never reverted.

=== Network ===
An Algorand network is a distributed system of nodes, each maintaining a local state based on validating the blockchain and the transactions therein. Nodes are spread geographically, communicating with each other over the Internet. The integrity and consistency of the global network state and distributed ledger are maintained by the consensus protocol. Algorand nodes communicate through message gossiping (broadcasting) either peer-to-peer or via relay nodes (which facilitate efficient broadcasting with minimal message hops and low latency). By default, nodes connect only to permissioned relays; an optional peer-to-peer mode also connects them to permissionless relays.

=== State proofs ===
Algorand periodically produces state proofs: compact certificates, signed by a stake-weighted supermajority of participants, that allow other systems to verify Algorand's state without running a node. They are signed with the Falcon post-quantum signature scheme.

=== Performance ===
In the protocol's original evaluation, a prototype running on 1,000 cloud virtual machines and simulating up to 500,000 users confirmed transactions in under a minute and achieved about 125 times Bitcoin's throughput. An independent benchmark published at EuroSys 2023 measured about 885 transactions per second, with a latency of about 8.5 seconds, on Algorand's test network.
