= Souradyuti Paul =

Indian cryptographer (born 1976)

- Education: Katholieke Universiteit Leuven; Indian Statistical Institute; Jadavpur University
- Known for: Hash Functions; Cryptanalysis; Fast Wide-pipe Hash Mode; Stream Ciphers
- Scientific career
- Fields: Cryptography
- Workplaces: Indian Institute of Technology Bhilai; University of Waterloo; NIST; Katholieke Universiteit Leuven
- Doctoral advisor: Bart Preneel
- Website: http://homes.esat.kuleuven.be/~psourady/

Souradyuti Paul (born 1976) is an Indian cryptologist. Formerly a member of COSIC, he is a full professor at Indian Institute of Technology Bhilai and a former Guest Researcher for the National Institute of Standards and Technology in the United States. He participated in cryptanalysis of RC4, Helix and Py family of ciphers among others. He has co-designed the following ciphers

- RC4A
- RCR-32, RCR-64.

He also contributed to the design of a hash function iteration mode of operation Fast-widepipe. While working at NIST Dr. Paul has worked towards the development of US government secure hash standard SHA-3 being selected through a public competition.
