= Fluhrer, Mantin and Shamir attack =

Cryptographic attack method

In cryptography, the Fluhrer, Mantin and Shamir attack is a stream cipher attack on the widely used RC4 stream cipher. The attack allows an attacker to recover the key in an RC4 encrypted stream from a large number of messages in that stream.

The Fluhrer, Mantin and Shamir attack applies to specific key derivation methods, but does not apply in general to RC4-based SSL (TLS), since SSL generates the encryption keys it uses for RC4 by hashing, meaning that different SSL sessions have unrelated keys. However, the closely related bar mitzvah attack, based on the same research and revealed in 2015, does exploit those cases where weak keys are generated by the SSL keying process.

== Background ==
The Fluhrer, Mantin and Shamir (FMS) attack, published in their 2001 paper "Weaknesses in the Key Scheduling Algorithm of RC4", takes advantage of a weakness in the RC4 key scheduling algorithm to reconstruct the key from encrypted messages. The FMS attack gained popularity in network attack tools including AirSnort, weplab, and aircrack, which use it to recover the key used by WEP protected wireless networks.

This discussion will use the below RC4 key scheduling algorithm (KSA).

begin ksa(with int keylength, with byte key[keylength])
    for i from 0 to 255
        S[i] := i
    endfor
    j := 0
    for i from 0 to 255
        j := (j + S[i] + key[i mod keylength]) mod 256
        swap(S[i],S[j])
    endfor
end

The following pseudo-random generation algorithm (PRGA) will also be used.

begin prga(with byte S[256])
    i := 0
    j := 0
    while GeneratingOutput:
        i := (i + 1) mod 256
        j := (j + S[i]) mod 256
        swap(S[i],S[j])
        output S[(S[i] + S[j]) mod 256]
    endwhile
end

== The attack ==
The basis of the FMS attack lies in the use of weak initialization vectors (IVs) used with RC4. RC4 encrypts one byte at a time with a keystream output from prga(); RC4 uses the key to initialize a state machine via ksa(), and then continuously modifies the state and generates a new byte of the keystream from the new state. Theoretically, the key stream functions as a random one-time pad, as a pseudo-random number generator controls the output at each step.

With certain IVs, an attacker knowing the first byte of the keystream and the first m bytes of the key can derive the (m + 1)th byte of the key due to a weakness in the KSA. Because the first byte of the plaintext comes from the WEP SNAP header, an attacker can assume they can derive the first byte of the keystream from B ⊕ 0xAA (the SNAP header is almost always 0xAA). From there, they only need an IV in the form (a + 3, n − 1, x) for key index a equal to 0, element value space n equal to 256 (since 8 bits make a byte), and any x. To start, the attacker needs IVs of (3, 255, x). WEP uses 24-bit IVs, making each value one byte long.

To start, the attacker utilizes the IV as the first 3 elements in K[ ]. They fill the S-box S[ ] with sequential values from 0 to n as RC4 does when initializing the S-box from a known K[ ]. They then perform the first 3 iterations of ksa() to begin initializing the S-box.

After the third step, the attacker can possibly, but not definitely, derive the fourth byte of the key using the keystream output O by computing (O − j − S[i]) mod n = K[i], with the value i = 3 at this step.

At this point, the attacker does not yet have the fourth byte of the key. This algorithm does not regenerate the next byte of the key; it generates a possible value of the key. By collecting multiple messages—for example WEP packets—and repeating these steps, the attacker will generate a number of different possible values. The correct value appears significantly more frequently than any other; the attacker can determine the value of the key by recognizing this value and selecting it as the next byte. At this point, they can start the attack over again on the fifth byte of the key.

Although the attacker cannot attack words of the key out of order, they can store messages for later sequential attack on later words once they know earlier words. Again, they only need messages with weak IVs, and can discard others. Through this process, they can gather a large number of messages for attack on the entire key; in fact, they can store only a short portion of the beginning of those messages, just enough to carry the attack out as far as the word of the key the IV will allow them to attack.

== See also ==
- Bar mitzvah attack
