= Silvio Micali =

Italian-American computer scientist (born 1954)

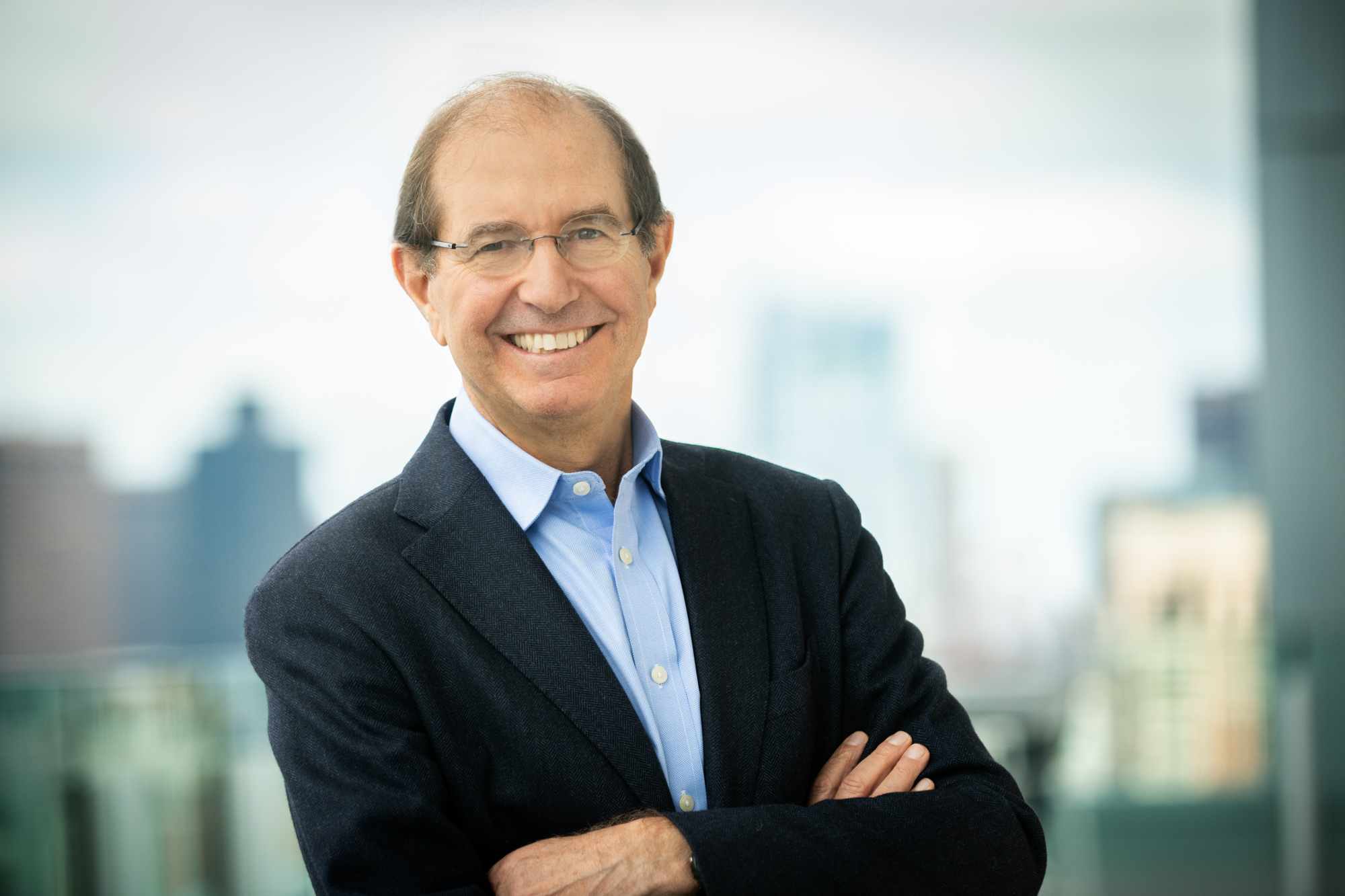
- Born: October 13, 1954 (age 71); Palermo, Italy
- Education: Sapienza University (BS); University of California, Berkeley (MS, PhD)
- Known for: Blum–Micali algorithm Goldwasser–Micali cryptosystem GMR algorithm Zero-knowledge proof Claw-free permutation Pseudorandom Functions; Peppercoin; Algorand; Semantic security Verifiable secret sharing
- Awards: Gödel Prize (1993); Turing Award (2012); ACM Fellow (2017)
- Scientific career
- Fields: Computer Science; Cryptography
- Workplaces: University of Toronto; University of Pennsylvania; Tsinghua University; MIT CS & AI Lab
- Thesis: Randomness versus Hardness (1983)
- Doctoral advisor: Manuel Blum
- Doctoral students: Mihir Bellare; Bonnie Berger; Alessandro Chiesa; Claude Crépeau; Shai Halevi; Rafail Ostrovsky; Phillip Rogaway
- Website: www.csail.mit.edu/person/silvio-micali

Silvio Micali (born October 13, 1954) is an Italian computer scientist, professor at the Massachusetts Institute of Technology and the founder of Algorand, a proof-of-stake blockchain cryptocurrency protocol. Micali's research at the MIT Computer Science and Artificial Intelligence Laboratory centers on cryptography and information security.

In 2012, he and Shafi Goldwasser received the Turing Award for their work on cryptography.

== Personal life ==
Micali graduated in mathematics at La Sapienza University of Rome in 1978 and earned a PhD degree in computer science from the University of California, Berkeley in 1982; for research supervised by Manuel Blum. Micali has been on the faculty of MIT's Electrical Engineering and Computer Science Department since 1983. He has also served on the faculty of the University of Pennsylvania, University of Toronto, and Tsinghua University. His research interests are cryptography, zero knowledge, pseudorandom generation, secure protocols, and mechanism design.

== Career ==
Micali is best known for some of his fundamental early work on public-key cryptosystems, pseudorandom functions, digital signatures, oblivious transfer, secure multiparty computation, and is one of the co-inventors of zero-knowledge proofs.

While a graduate student, Micali collaborated with another student, Shafi Goldwasser, to introduce the concept of probabilistic encryption. In this scheme, a message can be encrypted randomly to multiple different ciphertexts, providing semantic security because a pair of ciphertexts are indistinguishable even when an attacker can choose which messages they come from. Micali and his advisor Manuel Blum also developed a pseudorandom generator at this time, the Blum-Micali algorithm.

Micali, Goldwasser, and Charles Rackoff invented interactive proofs in the 1980s, at the same time as László Babai and Shlomo Moran. In an interactive proof system, participants develop a proof by answering a series of questions. Micali, Goldwasser, and Rackoff then introduced a special class of these, zero-knowledge proofs, in 1985. They defined a system where a prover interacts with a verifier to prove some theorem, without providing any additional knowledge to the verifier.

Micali's former doctoral students include Mihir Bellare, Bonnie Berger, Shai Halevi, Rafail Ostrovsky, and Phillip Rogaway.

In 2001, Micali co-founded CoreStreet Ltd, a software company originally based in Cambridge, Massachusetts which implemented Micali's patents involving checking the status of digital certificates (mainly applicable to large enterprise and government-sized digital and physical identity projects). Micali served as Chief Scientist at CoreStreet. CoreStreet was bought by ActivIdentity in 2009.

In the early 2000s, Micali also founded Peppercoin, a micropayments system which was acquired in 2007. In 2017, he founded Algorand.

=== Awards and honors ===
Micali won the Gödel Prize in 1993, along with Goldwasser, Rackoff, Babai and Moran, for their work inventing interactive proofs. He received the RSA Award for Excellence in Mathematics in 2004. In 2007, he was selected to be a member of the National Academy of Sciences and a Fellow of the International Association for Cryptologic Research (IACR). He is also a member of the National Academy of Engineering and the American Academy of Arts and Sciences.

He received the Turing Award for the year 2012 along with Shafi Goldwasser for their work in the field of cryptography. The Turing Award is considered the Nobel Prize of computing.

In 2015 the University of Salerno gave him an honorary degree. He was elected as an ACM Fellow in 2017.
