= Feige–Fiat–Shamir identification scheme =

In cryptography, the Feige–Fiat–Shamir identification scheme is a type of parallel zero-knowledge proof developed by Uriel Feige, Amos Fiat, and Adi Shamir in 1988. Like all zero-knowledge proofs, it allows one party, the Prover, to prove to another party, the Verifier, that they possess secret information without revealing to Verifier what that secret information is. The Feige–Fiat–Shamir identification scheme, however, uses modular arithmetic and a parallel verification process that limits the number of communications between Prover and Verifier.

== Setup ==
Following a common convention, call the prover Peggy and the verifier Victor.

Choose two large prime integers p and q and compute the product n = pq. Create secret numbers $s_1, \cdots, s_k$ coprime to n. Compute $v_i \equiv s_i^{2} \pmod{n}$. Peggy and Victor both receive $n$ while $p$ and $q$ are kept secret. Peggy is then sent the numbers $s_i$. These are her secret login numbers. Victor is sent the numbers $v_i$ by Peggy when she wishes to identify herself to Victor. Victor is unable to recover Peggy's $s_i$ numbers from his $v_i$ numbers due to the difficulty in determining a modular square root when the modulus' factorization is unknown.

== Procedure ==
1. Peggy chooses a random integer $r$, a random sign $s\in\{-1,1\}$ and computes $s \cdot x \equiv r^2 \pmod{n}$. Peggy sends $x$ to Victor.
2. Victor chooses numbers $a_1, \cdots, a_k$ where $a_i$ equals 0 or 1. Victor sends these numbers to Peggy.
3. Peggy computes $y \equiv rs_1^{a_1}s_2^{a_2} \cdots s_k^{a_k}\pmod{n}$. Peggy sends this number to Victor.
4. Victor checks that $y^2 \pmod{n} \equiv \pm\, x v_1^{a_1}v_2^{a_2} \cdots v_k^{a_k}\pmod{n}$ and that $x \neq 0 .$

This procedure is repeated with different $r$ and $a_i$ values until Victor is satisfied that Peggy does indeed possess the modular square roots ($s_i$) of his $v_i$ numbers.

== Security ==
In the procedure, Peggy does not give any useful information to Victor. She merely proves to Victor that she has the secret numbers without revealing what those numbers are.

Suppose Eve has intercepted Victor's $v_i$ numbers but does not know what Peggy's $s_i$ numbers are. If Eve wants to try to convince Victor that she is Peggy, she would have to correctly guess what Victor's $a_i$ numbers will be. She then picks a random $y$, calculates $x \equiv y^2 v_1^{-a_1}v_2^{-a_2} \cdots v_k^{-a_k}\pmod{n}$ and sends $x$ to Victor. When Victor sends $a_i$, Eve simply returns her $y$. Victor is satisfied and concludes that Eve has the secret numbers. However, the probability of Eve correctly guessing what Victor's $a_i$ will be is 1 in $2^k$. By repeating the procedure $t$ times, the probability drops to 1 in $2^{k t}$ . For $k = 5$ and $t = 4$ the probability of successfully posing as Peggy is less than 1 in 1 million.
