= Alan Sherman =

American computer scientist (born 1957)

- Born: February 26, 1957 (age 69); Cambridge, Massachusetts, U.S.
- Education: Brown University (BS); Massachusetts Institute of Technology (MS, PhD)
- Scientific career
- Fields: Computer security Information assurance Cryptology; Algorithms
- Thesis: Cryptology and VLSI: A Two-Part Dissertation (1986)
- Doctoral advisor: Ron Rivest
- Website: www.csee.umbc.edu/~sherman/

Alan Theodore Sherman (born February 26, 1957) is an American computer scientist. He is a professor of computer science at University of Maryland, Baltimore County (UMBC), and director of the UMBC Center for Information Security and Assurance (CISA), and director of the UMBC Chess Program. Sherman is an editor for Cryptologia, and is a member of Phi Beta Kappa and Sigma Xi.

== Education ==
After graduating as salutatorian from Lafayette High School in 1974, Sherman earned a bachelor's degree in mathematics from Brown University in 1978, a master's degree in electrical engineering and computer science from the Massachusetts Institute of Technology (MIT) in 1981, and a Ph.D. degree in computer science from MIT in 1987. Sherman's research interests include security of voting systems, cryptology, information assurance, and discrete algorithms.

== Chess ==
Sherman has been the faculty advisor of the UMBC Chess Club since 1991, after playing in a student vs. faculty match. He recruits chess players worldwide with academic scholarships. UMBC has been ranked among the best college teams, winning the Pan American Intercollegiate Team Chess Championship in 1996, 1998, 1999, 2000, 2001, 2002, 2005, 2008, 2009, and 2012. In 1997, he received a Meritorious Service Award from the USCF for his contributions to college chess.

== Bibliography ==
=== Books ===
- Sherman, Alan T. (1989). VLSI Placement and Routing: The PI Project. Springer-Verlag.
- David Chaum and Ronald L. Rivest and Sherman, Alan T. (1983). Advances in Cryptology – Proceedings of Crypto 82. Plenum Perss.

=== Significant academic articles ===
- Fisher, K. and Carback, R. and Sherman, A., Punchscan: Introduction and System Definition of a High-Integrity Election System, Proceedings of the IAVoSS Workshop On Trustworthy Elections (WOTE'06), Cambridge, UK, June 2006.
- David Chaum, Carback, R., Clark, J., Essex, A., Popoveniuc, S., Ronald Rivest, Ryan, P., Shen, E., and Sherman, A., Scantegrity II: end-to-end verifiability for optical scan election systems using invisible ink confirmation codes, Proceedings of the conference on Electronic voting technology, p. 1-13, July 28–29, 2008, San Jose, CA.
- Sherman, A. and McGrew, D., Key Establishment in Large Dynamic Groups Using One-Way Function Trees, IEEE Transactions on Software Engineering, v.29 n.5, May, 2003.
- Sherman, A., Kaliski, B. and Ronald Rivest, Is the Data Encryption Standard a group? (Results of cycling experiments on DES), Journal of Cryptology, v.1, n.1, 1998.
- Baldwin, R. and Sherman, A., How we solved the $100,000 Decipher Puzzle (16 hours too late), Cryptologia, XXIV:3, July, 1990.
