= Uriel Feige =

Israeli computer scientist

- אוריאל פייגה
- Education: Ph.D. Weizmann Institute of Science, 1992
- Known for: Feige–Fiat–Shamir identification scheme
- Scientific career
- Workplaces: Weizmann Institute
- Doctoral advisor: Adi Shamir

Uriel Feige (Hebrew: אוריאל פייגה) is an Israeli computer scientist who was a doctoral student of Adi Shamir.

== Life ==
Uriel Feige currently holds the post of Professor at the Department of Computer Science and Applied Mathematics, the Weizmann Institute of Science, Rehovot in Israel.

== Work ==
He is notable for co-inventing the Feige–Fiat–Shamir identification scheme along with Amos Fiat and Adi Shamir.

== Honors and awards ==
He won the Gödel Prize in 2001 "for the PCP theorem and its applications to hardness of approximation".
