= Margrit Betke =

Computer vision researcher and academic

Margrit Betke was a German-American Professor of Computer Science at Boston University. She earned her Ph.D. degree in Computer Science and Electrical Engineering at the Massachusetts Institute of Technology in 1995 under the supervision of Ron Rivest. Betke was designated a Senior Member of the ACM in October 2012.

Betke made important contributions in computer vision, medical image analysis, human-computer interfaces, and applications of machine learning. She co-invented, with James Gips, the "Camera Mouse," an assistive technology used worldwide by children and adults with severe motion impairments. She co-developed the first patented algorithms for detecting and measuring pulmonary nodule growth in computed tomography.

Earlier she held the position of Associate Editor, IEEE Transactions on Pattern Analysis and Machine Intelligence (TPAMI). A total of 18 students obtained PhDs under her guidance.
