= Peppercoin =

Cryptographic micropayment system

Peppercoin is a cryptographic system for processing micropayments. Peppercoin Inc. was a company that offered services based on the peppercoin method.

The peppercoin system was developed by Silvio Micali and Ron Rivest and first presented at the RSA Conference in 2002 (although it had not yet been named.) The core idea is to bill one randomly selected transaction a lump sum of money rather than bill each transaction a small amount. It uses "universal aggregation", which means that it aggregates transactions over users, merchants as well as payment service providers. The random selection is cryptographically secure—it cannot be influenced by any of the parties. It is claimed to reduce the transaction cost per dollar from 27 cents to "well below 10 cents."

Peppercoin, Inc. was a privately held company founded in late 2001 by Micali and Rivest based in Waltham, MA. It has secured about $15M in venture capital in two rounds of funding. Its services saw modest adoption. Peppercoin collects 5-9% of transaction cost from the merchant. Peppercoin, Inc. was bought out in 2007 by Chockstone for an undisclosed amount.
