= James Gips =

American computer scientist

- Education: MIT, Stanford University

James Gips (died June 10, 2018) was an American technologist, academic, and author based in Boston. He was the John R. and Pamela Egan Professor of computer science and professor of information systems at Boston College.

Gips’ research was focused around the use of technology to help people with disabilities live fuller lives. He was the co-inventor and principal developer of two assistive technologies, EagleEyes and Camera Mouse. Gips has written on a variety of topics including ethical robots, shape grammars and aesthetics.

In 2007, Gips won the da Vinci Award for exceptional design and engineering achievements in accessibility and universal design.

Gips died June 10, 2018, aged 72.

== Education ==
After completing his B.S. in Humanities and Engineering from MIT in 1967, Gips joined Stanford University for M.S. in Computer Science, which he completed in 1968. Subsequently, he joined the National Institute of Health, Bethesda, as Officer, U.S. Public Health Service and worked there until 1970. In 1970, he invented shape grammars with George Stiny. He returned for a Ph.D. in Computer Science at Stanford, completing it in 1974. His Ph.D. dissertation, “Shape Grammars and Their Uses,” was published as a book.

== Career ==
Gips joined University of California, Los Angeles in 1974 as Assistant Research Computer Scientist. While he was working there, he wrote the book “Algorithmic Aesthetics” with George Stiny. In 1976, he left UCLA and started teaching at Boston College. In 1979, while still teaching at Boston College, Gips joined Harvard University Summer School as an associate professor and taught there until 1983. In 1993, Gips along with Peter Olivieri and Joseph Tecce developed EagleEyes, a technology that allows disabled people to use a mouse pointer on a computer screen just by moving their eyes. EagleEyes uses electrodes placed on the persons head to move the mouse pointer by following their eye movements. EagleEyes was a finalist for the Discover Magazine Technological Innovation Awards in 1994 and in 2006 was named a Tech Museum Award Laureate by the Tech Museum of San Jose.

While working on a successor for EagleEyes, Gips and Margrit Betke thought of a program that would allow people to use a mouse with the movement of their head. The idea resulted in Camera Mouse. The application uses a standard webcam to track head movements and move the mouse pointer accordingly. A free public version of Camera Mouse was launched in 2007 and has over 3,000,000 downloads.

Gips has worked with S. Adam Brasel on research on technology and consumer behavior.

== Research Awards ==
- 2007 - da Vinci Award 2007

== Bibliography ==
=== Books ===
- Mastering Excel 2016: A Problem-Solving Approach, Pearson. (2016)
- Mastering Excel 2013: A Problem-Solving Approach, Pearson. (2013)
- Mastering Excel 2010: A Problem-Solving Approach, Pearson. (2011)
- Mastering Excel 2007: A Problem-Solving Approach, Pearson. (2007)
- An Eye Control Teaching Device for Students Without Language Expressive Capacity: EagleEyes, Edwin Mellen Press. (2001)
- Mastering Excel: A Problem-Solving Approach, John Wiley. (1997)
- Mastering Lotus 1-2-3: A Problem-Solving Approach, John Wiley. (1991)
- Algorithmic Aesthetics: Computer Models for Criticism and Design in the Arts, University of California Press, Berkeley. (1979)
- Shape Grammars and Their Uses, Birkhauser Verlag, Basel. (1975)

=== Selected articles ===
- Interface Psychology: Touchscreens Change Attribute Importance, Decision Criteria, and Behavior in Online Choice. Cyberpsychology, Behavior, and Social Networking. Vol. 18, No. 9, September 2015.
- Enhancing Television Advertising: Same-Language Subtitles Can Improve Brand Recall, Verbal Memory, and Behavioral Intent. Journal of the Academy of Marketing Science. Vol. 42, No. 3, May 2014.
- Red Bull ‘Gives You Wings’ For Better or Worse: A Double-Edged Impact of Brand Exposure on Performance. Journal of Consumer Psychology. Vol. 21, Issue 1, January 2011, pp. 57–64.
