= George Stiny =

American design and computation theorist

George Stiny is an American design and computation theorist. He co-created shape grammars with James Gips.

Stiny was educated at MIT and UCLA. He is currently a Professor in the Computation Group of the Department of Architecture at MIT. He was on the faculty at UCLA for fifteen years before joining the MIT Department of Architecture in 1996. He has also held appointments at the University of Sydney, the Royal College of Art (London), and the Open University.

== Published works ==
- Stiny, G. & Gips, J. (1972). Shape grammars and the generative specification of painting and sculpture. In Information Processing 71, pp. 1460–1465. North-Holland Publishing Company. link to article
- Stiny, G. (1975). Pictorial and Formal Aspects of Shape and Shape Grammars. Birkhäuser Basel. ISBN 978-3-0348-6879-2 link to book
- Stiny, G. & Gips, J. (1978). Algorithmic Aesthetics. University of California Press. ISBN 978-0-520-03467-9 link to book
- Stiny, G. (1980). Introduction to shape and shape grammars. Environment and Planning B: Planning and Design 7(3), 343–351.
- Stiny, G. (1980). Kindergarten grammars: designing with Froebel's building gifts. Environment and Planning B: Planning and Design 7(4), 409–462.
- Stiny, G. (2006). Shape: Talking about Seeing and Doing. MIT Press, Cambridge, MA. link to book
- The grammar of paradise: on the generation of Mughul gardens
- The Algebras of Design
