= Andrea LaPaugh =

American computer scientist

Andrea Suzanne LaPaugh is an American computer scientist and professor emerita of computer science at Princeton University. Her research has concerned the design and analysis of algorithms, particularly for graph algorithms, problems involving the computer-aided design of VLSI circuits, and document retrieval.

== Early life and education ==
LaPaugh is originally from Middletown, Connecticut, where her father worked in an office and her mother was a librarian; she majored in physics at Cornell University. This was at a time when Cornell had no undergraduate computer science program, but she became interested in computer science through courses on mathematical logic and formal languages, with instructors including Anil Nerode, Juris Hartmanis, and John Hopcroft. She began her doctoral studies at the Massachusetts Institute of Technology in 1974, working with Ron Rivest on graph algorithms, and finished her Ph.D. there in 1980 with the dissertation Algorithms for Integrated Circuit Layout: An Analytic Approach.

== Career and later life ==
LaPaugh worked for a year as a visiting assistant professor at Brown University before joining the Princeton University faculty as an assistant professor in 1981, at first as the only female engineering faculty member and, after earning tenure in 1987, as the only tenured woman in engineering. She was promoted to full professor in 1995, and was the master of Forbes College at Princeton from 2000 to 2004. She retired to become a professor emerita in 2019.

== Selected publications ==
- LaPaugh, Andrea S.; Rivest, Ronald L. (1980), "The subgraph homeomorphism problem", Journal of Computer and System Sciences, 20 (2): 133–149, doi:10.1016/0022-0000(80)90057-4, hdl:1721.1/148927
- Coffman, Edward G. Jr.; Garey, M. R.; Johnson, David S.; LaPaugh, Andrea S. (1985), "Scheduling file transfers", SIAM Journal on Computing, 14 (3): 744–780, doi:10.1137/0214054
- LaPaugh, Andrea S. (1993), "Recontamination does not help to search a graph", Journal of the ACM, 40 (2): 224–245, doi:10.1145/151261.151263, S2CID 2132020
- Chao, Liang-Fang; LaPaugh, Andrea S.; Sha, Edwin Hsing-Mean (1993), "Rotation scheduling: A loop pipelining algorithm", in Dunlop, Alfred E. (ed.), Proceedings of the 30th Design Automation Conference, Dallas, Texas, USA, June 14-18, 1993, ACM Press, pp. 566–572, doi:10.1145/157485.165042, S2CID 9256330
