= Variably Modified Permutation Composition =

Stream cipher

VMPC (Variably Modified Permutation Composition) for cryptography is a stream cipher similar to the well known and popular cipher RC4 designed by Ron Rivest. It was designed by Bartosz Żółtak, presented in 2004 at the Fast Software Encryption conference.

The core of the cipher is the VMPC function, a transformation of n-element permutations defined as:

for x from 0 to n-1:
    g(x) = VMPC(f)(x) = f(f(f(x))+1)

The function was designed such that inverting it, i.e. obtaining f from g, would be a complex problem. According to computer simulations the average number of operations required to recover f from g for a 16-element permutation is about 2^{11}; for 64-element permutation, about 2^{53}; and for a 256-element permutation, about 2^{260}.

In 2006 at Cambridge University, Kamil Kulesza investigated the problem of inverting VMPC and concluded "results indicate that VMPC is not a good candidate for a cryptographic one-way function".

The VMPC function is used in an encryption algorithm – the VMPC stream cipher. The algorithm allows for efficient in software implementations; to encrypt L bytes of plaintext do:

All arithmetic is performed modulo 256.
i := 0
while GeneratingOutput:
    j := S[j + S[i]]
    
    output S[S[S[j]] + 1]
    swap S[i] and S[j]          (b := S[j]; S[j] := S[i]; S[i] := b))
    
    i := i + 1
endwhile

Where 256-element permutation P and integer value s are obtained from the encryption password using the VMPC-KSA (Key Scheduling Algorithm).
