= Chris Rivest =

Chris Rivest is an American entrepreneur and co-founder of SunPrint (later Alion), a company that develops technology to inexpensively fabricate solar cells using acoustic printing. He is a graduate of the Massachusetts Institute of Technology.

In 2010 he was recognized as a "young innovator" by being listed in the MIT Technology Review's TR35 list.

He is the son of Ron Rivest, the cryptographer and founder of RSA.
