= Benny Chor =

Israeli computer scientist

- בני שור
- Born: 23 December 1956
- Died: 10 June 2021 (aged 64)
- Education: Hebrew University of Jerusalem (BSc, MSc); Massachusetts Institute of Technology (PhD)
- Known for: Research in cryptography, traitor tracing, randomness extractors, private information retrieval, RSA encryption, secret sharing, distributed shared-memory consensus, gene expression data patterns
- Awards: ACM Doctoral Dissertation Award (1985)
- Scientific career
- Fields: Computer science Cryptography
- Workplaces: Technion – Israel Institute of Technology; Tel Aviv University
- Doctoral advisor: Ron Rivest

Ben-Zion "Benny" Chor (Hebrew: בני שור; 23 December 1956 – 10 June 2021) was an Israeli computer scientist. He was known for his research in cryptography, including traitor tracing, randomness extractors, private information retrieval, the security level and single-bit security of RSA encryption, and secret sharing. Beyond cryptography, he also made important contributions in distributed shared-memory consensus and in the discovery of patterns in gene expression data.

== Early life and education ==
Chor was born on 23 December 1956, and raised in Tel Aviv. He was an undergraduate mathematics student at the Hebrew University of Jerusalem, graduating in 1980 and earning a master's degree there in 1981.

He became a doctoral student in computer science at the Massachusetts Institute of Technology (MIT), working there on cryptography with Ron Rivest; he completed his Ph.D. in 1985 with the dissertation Two Issues in Public Key Cryptography: RSA Bit Security and a New Knapsack Type System. With this work, he became a series winner of the 1985 ACM Doctoral Dissertation Award.

== Career and later life ==
After postdoctoral research at MIT and Harvard University, Chor became a faculty member at the Technion – Israel Institute of Technology from 1987 to 1999. He moved to Tel Aviv University in 1999, where he remained for the rest of his career. He headed the Tel Aviv School of Computer Science from 2018 to 2020. In 2019, he became founding head of the French-Israeli Laboratory on Foundations of Computer Science.

Chor died on 10 June 2021.

== Book ==
Chor was the coauthor, with Amir Rubenstein, of the book Computational Thinking for Life Scientists: Using Algorithms in Biological Research, published posthumously by the Cambridge University Press in 2022.
