= Interlock (band) =

- Origin: London
- Genres: Industrial metal
- Years active: 1996–2008
- Label: Anticulture Records
- Members: John Tyrell, Syan, Hal Sinden, Christina Gajny, Mart Anthony, Joe Butterworth
- Past members: See: Previous members section
- Website: http://www.myspace.com/interlock

Interlock was a British industrial metal band. It was formed in London in 1996 by John Tyrell (guitars/programming) and Syan (bass), and it disbanded in 2008.

== Biography ==
=== Early history ===
Interlock was formed in 1996 by guitarist, programmer and songwriter John Tyrell. Taking his influence from bands such as Fear Factory, My Dying Bride and Nine Inch Nails, he was joined by the co-founder, and only other consistent member, Syan (bass). A demo, which was later to become known as demo '97 was recorded on a 4 track and Digital Compact Cassette and subsequently released in May 1997. Matthew Lee (vocals/lyrics/samples) and Syan, a friend of John, filling in on female vocals also featured on this demo. The band gained some attention from UK magazines and fanzines due to the use of electronics, male and female singers and the accompanying inlay; a full colour, photocopied, eight-page design from John and spray painted audio cassette.

They played some small tours of the UK despite issues with maintaining a stable line up. Early Interlock shows were marked by the absence of a live drummer, the band performing to a pre-recorded drum and sample track, sometimes joined onstage by various keyboard players and at one point a violinist.

Interlock self-released the Submerged EP in 1999, with new female singer Emmeline May to even more widespread magazine praise, gaining features in Kerrang!'s 'scumscene' section and small features in Terrorizer. After a few shows in support of the EP, the band released a split album with neo-classical goth band Seventh Harmonic, remixing three of their songs and one of Interlock's own. In 2000 Matthew Lee left the band. Hal Sinden (vocals/lyrics), grandson of actor Donald Sinden, joined shortly after.

=== Death by Design ===
Interlock entered the studio in 2001 to record a split album with fellow London band, Needleye. The album Death by Design was recorded entirely by John under the Deepwater Production moniker, recording both Interlock's and Needleye's songs. It featured two original songs by each artist, two remixes of each other and a collaborative track. The CD was released in 2002 on the Armalyte Records label, with a full co-headline UK tour with Needleye. Future Kingsize Blues drummer, Tori Lucian joined Interlock on the tour. The band became regularly seen in Terrorizer's end of year polls as "best unsigned band" and Hal Sinden as "most shaggable male", and in 2003 were part of a documentary on gothic culture Sex, Lies and Bondage Tape, first shown on Anglia TV.

=== crisis//reinvention ===
The band started writing new material as soon as they had confirmed their new drummer Matt Platts (ex Salem Orchid, ex Nightnurse) towards the end of 2002. Chris 'Static' Dixon (guitars) also joined at the start of 2004, due to John fracturing his arm and needing a backup guitarist. The band started talking with Anticulture Records after airplay on Maz Star's Total Rock Radio show, which included a never officially released version of Björk's "Army of Me".

Negotiations ensued and Interlock signed to Anticulture Records in early 2005. Once again, John produced the entirety of the record as well as designing and creating the artwork. crisis//reinvention was released in May 2005 on Anticulture and was immediately playlisted by BBC Radio 1 Rock Show and Total Rock Radio among other radio stations.

The band had been touring sporadically for some months when Emmeline May left to be replaced by Christina Gajny (vocals), originally only intending to be a stand in for a festival based in Buckinghamshire, UK, she was quickly recruited as a full-time member. With Christina aboard they started to re-record a selection of songs and play shows in the UK.

=== "Skinless" remixes ===
The band recorded a video for the song "Skinless", with CGI artist Christian Jelen (White Noise, MirrorMask) in late 2005, the editing eventually was handled by Lasse Hoile (Porcupine Tree). In the meantime, Interlock put together a competition for the general public to remix "Skinless" and submit it to the band. The winner, Elseedy was to appear alongside 7 other remixes of Skinless by other artists and two original songs by Interlock. The resulting EP was released in February 2006 and featured Christina's vocals on the title track and new song, "Blue".

A video for "Straight" was filmed and consequently scrapped due to "internal pressures". For the rest of the year the band toured intermittently within the UK. Matt Platts left in November.

=== US tour ===
At the start of 2007 Interlock confirmed new drummer, Joe Butterworth and a tour of America. The band also filmed a new video for "Straight" which was handled by band friend, Mart Anthony, and a digi-release for that song was planned by Anticulture records. The digi-release never took place but the video was released in May.

The 'Trans-Atlantic' tour started in April in London and continued with industrial band, Inswarm in America. When they returned to the UK the band parted with Chris 'Static' and enlisted Mart Anthony to help for the rest of the tour. Mart was confirmed as a permanent member shortly after.

In July Interlock played Hellfest Summer Open Air in France and their last shows of the year, taking time out to write for a new album.

=== Final days ===
In late 2007, Interlock announced their departure from Anticulture Records and released demos of their upcoming album Parasite. But after spending several months in writing and recording at the start of 2008, they released the following statement on their website in August, announcing their split;

"26 August 2008

We are very sad to announce that Interlock's slot on the rock stage at Offset this Saturday will be the band's final live show.

Due to various pressures within the band, a decision has been made to disband Interlock straight after the performance.

We would like to take this opportunity to thank each and every person for their continued support over the years. The Interlock road has been a long and interesting one. We have met some amazing people on the way and will remember many. The bands, the musicians, the Interlock armies, the friends, the promoters, the magazines and zines, radio stations, venues, endorsers and of course, most importantly, the fans; those guys that have followed our exploits, van and mad ramblings. those that have housed us, fed us and saved our arses when we've needed you most. Thank you for screaming along to our music for this long. Now you can rest your larynx

We hope that our music has given the listeners half as much pleasure as it has given the band over the years. No doubt various members of Interlock will be continuing in other projects in the future, so please check the bands official myspace page www.myspace.com/interlock for updates and announcements

Interlock has left the building... thank you and goodnight.

John Tyrell has now formed Khaidian. Hal Sinden and Joe Butterworth have formed Talanas. Syan has joined Tribazik as bassist. Christina Gajny now sings for Inner Eden. Mart Anthony has formed Wolfshead and has played guitar for Beth Ryan.

== Members ==
=== Current members ===
- John Tyrell (a.k.a. John Hull) – guitar / programming / songwriter / record producer (1996–2008)
- Syan (a.k.a. Sabrina Barlow) – bass (1996–2008)
- Hal Sinden – vocals / lyricist (2000–2008)
- Mart Anthony – guitar (2007–2008)
- Christina Gajny – vocals (2005–2008)
- Joe Butterworth – drums (2006–2008)

=== Previous members ===
- Chris 'Static' Dixon – guitar (2004–2007)
- Matt Platts – drums (2002–2006)
- Emmeline May – vocals (1998–2005)
- Frank Hull – drums (2001–2002)
- Matthew Lee – vocals / lyricist (1996–2000)

=== Live members ===
- Rob Archibald – bass (2008)
- Tori Lucion – drums (2002)
- Pixi – vocals (1997–1998)

== Discography ==
=== Albums ===
- Death by Design (split CD with Needleye) (2002) Armalyte Industries
- crisis//reinvention (2005) Anticulture Records
- Skinless Remixes (2007) Anticulture Records

=== Demos ===
- Demo – 1997 (1997)
- Submerged (1999)
- Seventh Harmonic vs. Interlock (split CD with Seventh Harmonic) (2000)
- Parasite demos (2008)

=== Compilation appearances ===
- "Rest" on No Holy Additives (1998) Eldthorne
- "Rest (tilted 2.0)" remix on Full Tilt III compilation (2001) spiky black cat records
- "The Hold (CDW)" and "Birdman (edit)" on Working with Children and Animals (2002) Wasp Factory records
- "This Waking Moment", "Coalesce" and "the Feeling Skinned Us remix" on Vampire Diary OST (2007)
