= Ron Rivest =

American cryptographer (born 1947)

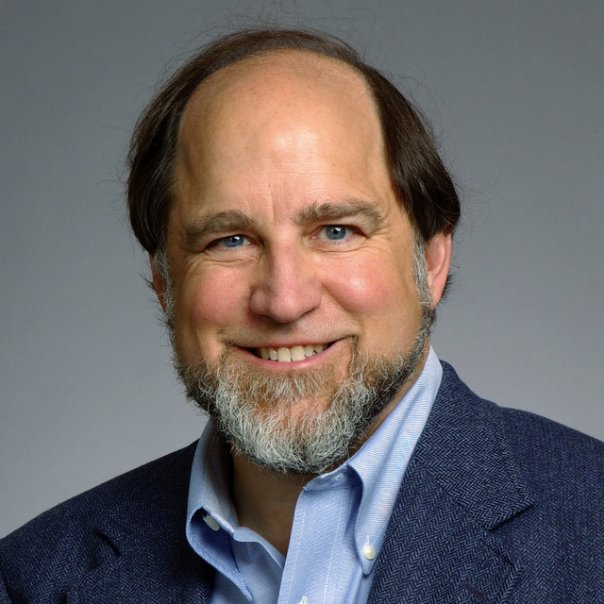
- Rivest in 2012
- Born: May 6, 1947 (age 79); Schenectady, New York, U.S.
- Education: Yale University (BA); Stanford University (MS, PhD)
- Known for: Public-key; RSA, RC2, RC4, RC5, RC6; MD2, MD4, MD5, MD6, Ring signature
- Awards: Paris Kanellakis Award (1996); National Computer Systems Security Award (1996); Turing Award (2002); Marconi Prize (2007); BBVA Foundation Frontiers of Knowledge Awards (2017); National Inventors Hall of Fame (2018)
- Scientific career
- Fields: Algorithms; Cryptography; Machine learning; Election security
- Workplaces: Massachusetts Institute of Technology
- Thesis: Analysis of associative retrieval algorithms (1974)
- Doctoral advisor: Robert W. Floyd
- Doctoral students: Margrit Betke; Avrim Blum; Benny Chor; Sally Goldman; Burt Kaliski; Andrea LaPaugh; Anna Lysyanskaya; Ron Pinter; Robert Schapire; Alan Sherman; Mona Singh; Donna Slonim
- Website: people.csail.mit.edu/rivest/

Ronald Linn Rivest (/rɪˈvɛst/; born May 6, 1947) is an American cryptographer and computer scientist whose work has spanned the fields of algorithms and combinatorics, cryptography, machine learning, and election integrity. He is an Institute Professor at the Massachusetts Institute of Technology (MIT), and a member of MIT's Department of Electrical Engineering and Computer Science and its Computer Science and Artificial Intelligence Laboratory.

Along with Adi Shamir and Len Adleman, Rivest is one of the inventors of the RSA algorithm, for which they won the 2002 ACM Turing Award. He is also the inventor of the symmetric key encryption algorithms RC2, RC4, and RC5, and co-inventor of RC6. He also devised the MD2, MD4, MD5 and MD6 cryptographic hash functions.

== Education ==
Rivest earned a bachelor's degree in mathematics from Yale University in 1969, and a Ph.D. degree in computer science from Stanford University in 1974 for research supervised by Robert W. Floyd.

== Career ==
At MIT, Rivest is a member of the Theory of Computation Group, and founder of MIT CSAIL's Cryptography and Information Security Group.

Rivest was a founder of RSA Data Security (now merged with Security Dynamics to form RSA Security), Verisign, and of Peppercoin.

His former doctoral students include Avrim Blum, Benny Chor, Sally Goldman, Burt Kaliski, Anna Lysyanskaya, Margrit Betke, Ron Pinter, Robert Schapire, Alan Sherman, and Mona Singh.

== Research ==
Rivest is especially known for his research in cryptography. He has also made significant contributions to algorithm design, to the computational complexity of machine learning, and to election security.

=== Cryptography ===
Rivest, jointly with Adi Shamir and Leonard Adleman, introduced the RSA cryptosystem in 1978,^{[C1]} which revolutionized modern cryptography by providing the first usable and publicly described method for public-key cryptography. Rivest had reportedly thought of the key idea behind the cryptosystem after having drunk large amounts of wine while celebrating Passover with Shamir and Adleman at a student's house. The three won the 2002 Turing Award for "their ingenious contribution to making public-key cryptography useful in practice." The same paper was also the first to introduce Alice and Bob, the fictional heroes of many subsequent cryptographic protocols. In the same year, Rivest, Adleman, and Michael Dertouzos first formulated homomorphic encryption and its applications in secure cloud computing,^{[C2]} an idea that would not come to fruition until over 40 years later when secure homomorphic encryption algorithms were finally developed.

Rivest was one of the inventors of the GMR public signature scheme, published with Shafi Goldwasser and Silvio Micali in 1988,^{[C3]} and of ring signatures, an anonymized form of group signatures invented with Shamir and Yael Tauman Kalai in 2001.^{[C7]} He designed the MD4 and MD5 cryptographic hash functions, published in 1990 and 1992 respectively,^{[C4]}^{[C5]} and a sequence of symmetric key block ciphers that include RC2, RC4, RC5, and RC6.^{[C6]}^{[C8]}

Other contributions of Rivest to cryptography include chaffing and winnowing, the interlock protocol for authenticating anonymous key-exchange, cryptographic time capsules such as LCS35 based on anticipated improvements to computation speed through Moore's law, key whitening and its application through the xor–encrypt–xor key mode in extending the Data Encryption Standard to DES-X, and the Peppercoin system for cryptographic micropayments.

=== Algorithms ===
In 1973, Rivest and his coauthors published the first selection algorithm that achieved linear time without using randomization.^{[A1]} Their algorithm, the median of medians method, is commonly taught in algorithms courses. Rivest is also one of the two namesakes of the Floyd–Rivest algorithm, a randomized selection algorithm that achieves a near-optimal number of comparisons.^{[A2]}

Rivest's 1974 doctoral dissertation concerned the use of hash tables to quickly match partial words in documents; he later published this work as a journal paper.^{[A3]} His research from this time on self-organizing lists^{[A4]} became one of the important precursors to the development of competitive analysis for online algorithms. In the early 1980s, he also published well-cited research on two-dimensional bin packing problems,^{[A5]} and on channel routing in VLSI design.^{[A6]}

He is a co-author of Introduction to Algorithms (also known as CLRS), a standard textbook on algorithms, with Thomas H. Cormen, Charles E. Leiserson and Clifford Stein. First published in 1990, it has extended into four editions, the latest in 2022.^{[A7]}

=== Learning ===
In the problem of decision tree learning, Rivest and Laurent Hyafil proved that it is NP-complete to find a decision tree that identifies each of a collection of objects through binary-valued questions (as in the parlor game of twenty questions) and that minimizes the expected number of questions that will be asked.^{[L1]} With Avrim Blum, Rivest also showed that even for very simple neural networks it can be NP-complete to train the network by finding weights that allow it to solve a given classification task correctly.^{[L3]} Despite these negative results, he also found methods for efficiently inferring decision lists,^{[L2]} decision trees,^{[L4]} and finite automata.^{[L5]}

=== Elections ===
A significant topic in Rivest's more recent research has been election security, based on the principle of software independence: that the security of elections should be founded on physical records, so that hidden changes to software used in voting systems cannot result in undetectable changes to election outcomes. His research in this area includes improving the robustness of mix networks in this application,^{[V1]} the 2006 invention of the ThreeBallot paper ballot based end-to-end auditable voting system (which he released into public domain in the interest of promoting democracy),^{[V2]} and the development of the Scantegrity security system for optical scan voting systems.^{[V3]}

He was a member of the Election Assistance Commission's Technical Guidelines Development Committee.

== Honors and awards ==
Rivest is a member of the National Academy of Engineering, the National Academy of Sciences, and is a Fellow of the Association for Computing Machinery, the International Association for Cryptologic Research, and the American Academy of Arts and Sciences. In 1996 he shared the National Computer Systems Security Award from the NIST and NSA with Whitfield Diffie and Martin Hellman. Together with Adi Shamir and Len Adleman, he has been awarded the 2000 IEEE Koji Kobayashi Computers and Communications Award and the Secure Computing Lifetime Achievement Award. He also shared with them the Turing Award. Rivest has received an honorary degree (the "laurea honoris causa") from the Sapienza University of Rome. In 2005, he received the MITX Lifetime Achievement Award. Rivest was named in 2007 the Marconi Fellow, and on May 29, 2008, he also gave the Chesley lecture at Carleton College. He was named an Institute Professor at MIT in June 2015.

== Selected publications ==
Rivest's publications include:

=== Algorithms ===
A1.	Blum, Manuel; Floyd, Robert W.; Pratt, Vaughan; Rivest, Ronald L.; Tarjan, Robert E. (1973). "Time bounds for selection" (PDF). Journal of Computer and System Sciences. 7 (4): 448–461. doi:10.1016/S0022-0000(73)80033-9. MR 0329916. Previously announced as "Linear time bounds for median computations", STOC 1972.

A2.	Floyd, Robert W.; Rivest, Ronald L. (March 1975). "Expected time bounds for selection". Communications of the ACM. 18 (3): 165–172. doi:10.1145/360680.360691. S2CID 3064709. See also "Algorithm 489: the algorithm SELECT—for finding the $i$th smallest of $n$ elements", p. 173, doi:10.1145/360680.360694.

A3.	Rivest, Ronald L. (1976). "Partial-match retrieval algorithms". SIAM Journal on Computing. 5 (1): 19–50. doi:10.1137/0205003. MR 0395398. Previously announced at the 15th Annual Symposium on Switching and Automata Theory, 1974.

A4.	Rivest, Ronald (1976). "On self-organizing sequential search heuristics". Communications of the ACM. 19 (2): 63–67. doi:10.1145/359997.360000. MR 0408303. S2CID 498886. Previously announced at the 15th Annual Symposium on Switching and Automata Theory, 1974.

A5.	Baker, Brenda S.; Coffman, E. G. Jr.; Rivest, Ronald L. (1980). "Orthogonal packings in two dimensions". SIAM Journal on Computing. 9 (4): 846–855. doi:10.1137/0209064. MR 0592771.

A6.	Rivest, Ronald L.; Fiduccia, Charles M. (1982). "A "greedy" channel router". In Crabbe, James S.; Radke, Charles E.; Ofek, Hillel (eds.). Proceedings of the 19th Design Automation Conference, DAC '82, Las Vegas, Nevada, USA, June 14–16, 1982. ACM and IEEE. pp. 418–424. doi:10.1145/800263.809239. ISBN 0-89791-020-6.

A7.	Cormen, Thomas H.; Leiserson, Charles E.; Rivest, Ronald L. (1990). Introduction to Algorithms (1st ed.). MIT Press and McGraw-Hill. ISBN 0-262-03141-8. 2nd edition, with Clifford Stein, 2001. 3rd edition, 2009. 4th edition, 2022.

=== Cryptography ===
C1.	Rivest, R. L.; Shamir, A.; Adleman, L. (1978). "A method for obtaining digital signatures and public-key cryptosystems". Communications of the ACM. 21 (2): 120–126. doi:10.1145/359340.359342. hdl:1721.1/148910. MR 0700103. S2CID 2873616.

C2.	Rivest, R.; Adleman, L.; Dertouzos, M. (1978). "On data banks and privacy homomorphisms". In DeMillo, Richard A. (ed.). Foundations of Secure Computation. Academic Press. pp. 169–177.

C3.	Goldwasser, Shafi; Micali, Silvio; Rivest, Ronald L. (1988). "A digital signature scheme secure against adaptive chosen-message attacks". SIAM Journal on Computing. 17 (2): 281–308. doi:10.1137/0217017. MR 0935341. S2CID 1715998. Previously announced as "A 'paradoxical' solution to the signature problem", FOCS 1984 and CRYPTO 1984.

C4.	Rivest, Ronald L. (October 1990). The MD4 Message Digest Algorithm. Network Working Group. doi:10.17487/RFC1186. RFC 1186.

C5.	Rivest, Ronald L. (April 1992). The MD5 Message-Digest Algorithm. Network Working Group. doi:10.17487/RFC1321. RFC 1321.

C6.	Rivest, Ronald L. (March 1998). A Description of the RC2(r) Encryption Algorithm. Network Working Group. doi:10.17487/RFC2268. RFC 2268.

C7.	Rivest, Ronald L.; Shamir, Adi; Tauman, Yael (2001). "How to Leak a Secret". In Boyd, Colin (ed.). Advances in Cryptology – ASIACRYPT 2001, 7th International Conference on the Theory and Application of Cryptology and Information Security, Gold Coast, Australia, December 9–13, 2001, Proceedings. Lecture Notes in Computer Science. Vol. 2248. Springer. pp. 552–565. doi:10.1007/3-540-45682-1_32. ISBN 978-3-540-42987-6.

C8.	Rivest, Ronald L. (1994). "The RC5 encryption algorithm". In Preneel, Bart (ed.). Fast Software Encryption: Second International Workshop. Leuven, Belgium, 14–16 December 1994, Proceedings. Lecture Notes in Computer Science. Vol. 1008. Springer. pp. 86–96. doi:10.1007/3-540-60590-8_7. ISBN 978-3-540-60590-4.

=== Learning ===
L1.	Hyafil, Laurent; Rivest, Ronald L. (May 1976). "Constructing optimal binary decision trees is NP-complete". Information Processing Letters. 5 (1): 15–17. doi:10.1016/0020-0190(76)90095-8. MR 0413598.

L2.	Rivest, Ronald L. (1987). "Learning decision lists". Machine Learning. 2 (3): 229–246. doi:10.1007/BF00058680. S2CID 2840541.

L3.	Blum, Avrim; Rivest, Ronald L. (1992). "Training a 3-node neural network is NP-complete". Neural Networks. 5 (1): 117–127. doi:10.1016/S0893-6080(05)80010-3. S2CID 8567973. Previously in NIPS 1988.

L4.	Quinlan, J. Ross; Rivest, Ronald L. (1989). "Inferring decision trees using the minimum description length principle". Information and Computation. 80 (3): 227–248. Bibcode:1989InCo...80..227R. doi:10.1016/0890-5401(89)90010-2. hdl:1721.1/149137. MR 0984483.

L5.	Rivest, Ronald L.; Schapire, Robert E. (1993). "Inference of finite automata using homing sequences". Information and Computation. 103 (2): 299–347. doi:10.1006/inco.1993.1021. MR 1216458. Previously announced at STOC 1989.

=== Elections and voting ===
V1.	Jakobsson, Markus; Juels, Ari; Rivest, Ronald L. (2002). "Making mix nets robust for electronic voting by randomized partial checking". In Boneh, Dan (ed.). Proceedings of the 11th USENIX Security Symposium, San Francisco, CA, USA, August 5-9, 2002. Boston, Massachusetts: USENIX Association. pp. 339–353.

V2.	Rivest, Ronald L.; Smith, Warren D. (August 2007). "Three voting protocols: ThreeBallot, VAV, and Twin" (PDF). 2007 USENIX/ACCURATE Electronic Voting Technology Workshop (EVT 07). Boston, Massachusetts: USENIX Association.

V3.	Chaum, David; Carback, Richard; Clark, Jeremy; Essex, Aleksander; Popoveniuc, Stefan; Rivest, Ronald L.; Ryan, Peter Y. A.; Shen, Emily; Sherman, Alan T. (2008). "Scantegrity II: end-to-end verifiability for optical scan election systems using invisible ink confirmation codes" (PDF). In Dill, David L.; Kohno, Tadayoshi (eds.). 2008 USENIX/ACCURATE Electronic Voting Workshop, EVT 2008, July 28-29, 2008, San Jose, CA, USA, Proceedings. Boston, Massachusetts: USENIX Association.

== Personal life ==
Rivest is married to Gail Rivest with whom he has two sons, Alex Rivest, filmmaker, and Chris Rivest, entrepreneur and company co-founder.

== See also ==
- List of pioneers in computer science
