= Ueli Maurer (cryptographer) =

Swiss cryptographer

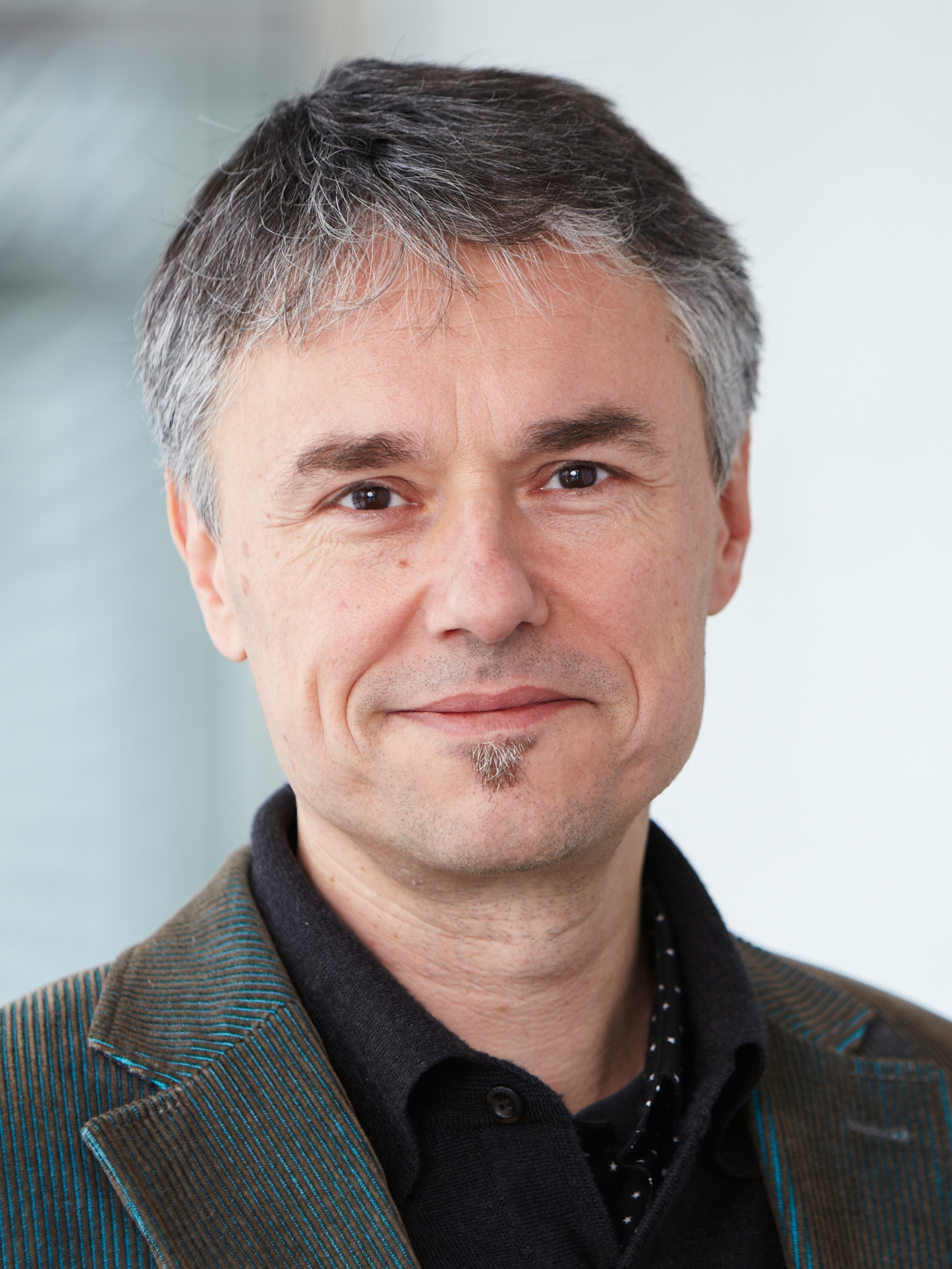
- Ueli Maurer (2010)
- Born: 26 May 1960 (age 66); St. Gallen, Switzerland
- Awards: IACR Fellow; ACM Fellow

Academic background
- Education: Swiss Federal Institute of Technology Zurich
- Thesis: Provable Security in Cryptography (1990)
- Doctoral advisor: James Massey

Academic work
- Discipline: Cryptography
- Institutions: Swiss Federal Institute of Technology Zurich
- Doctoral students: Daniel Bleichenbacher; Christian Cachin; Jan Camenisch; Renato Renner
- Website: www.crypto.ethz.ch/~maurer/

Ueli Maurer (born 26 May 1960) is a professor of cryptography at the Swiss Federal Institute of Technology Zurich (ETH Zurich).

== Education ==
Maurer studied electrical engineering at ETH Zurich and obtained his PhD in 1990, advised by James Massey. He joined Princeton University as a postdoc from 1990 to 1991.

== Career ==
In a seminal work, he showed that the Diffie-Hellman problem is (under certain conditions) equivalent to solving the discrete log problem.

From 2002 until 2008, Maurer also served on the board of Tamedia AG.

Maurer was appointed editor-in-chief of the Journal of Cryptology in 2002 for a three-year term. He was reappointed to a second three-year term as editor-in-chief of the same journal from 2005.

In 2008, Maurer was named a Fellow of the International Association for Cryptologic Research "for fundamental contributions to information-theoretic cryptography, service to the IACR, and sustained educational leadership in cryptology." In 2015, he was named a Fellow of the Association for Computing Machinery "for contributions to cryptography and information security." In 2016, he was awarded the RSA Award for Excellence in Mathematics.

== Accolades ==
- 2016: RSA Security (RSA) Award for Excellence in Mathematics
- 2015: Fellow of the Association for Computing Machinery (ACM)
- 2008: Fellow of the International Association for Cryptologic Research (IACR)
- 2007: Member of the German National Academy of Sciences Leopoldina
- 2003: Fellow of the IEEE
