= Encyclopedia of Cryptography and Security =

Book by Technische Universiteit Eindhoven

- Author: Henk C.A.v. Tilborg, Eindhoven University of Technology, (Editor)
- Language: English
- Series: Mathematics; Computer Science
- Genre: Encyclopedia
- Publisher: Springer-Verlag New York
- Publication date: 2005
- Publication place: The Netherlands
- Media type: Print; E-reference (1st edition); E-reference (2nd edition)
- Pages: 684
- ISBN: 978-0-387-23473-1
- OCLC: 61030073
- Dewey Decimal: 652/.803 22
- LC Class: Z103 .E53 2005

The Encyclopedia of Cryptography and Security is a comprehensive work on Cryptography for both information security professionals and experts in the fields of Computer Science, Applied Mathematics, Engineering, Information Theory, Data Encryption, etc. It consists of 460 articles in alphabetical order and is available electronically and in print. The Encyclopedia has a representative Advisory Board consisting of 18 leading international specialists.

Topics include but are not limited to authentication and identification, copy protection, cryptoanalysis and security, factorization algorithms and primality tests, cryptographic protocols, key management, electronic payments and digital certificates, hash functions and MACs, elliptic curve cryptography, quantum cryptography and web security.

The style of the articles is of explanatory character and can be used for undergraduate or graduate courses.

== Advisory board members ==
- Carlisle Adams, Entrust, Inc.
- Friedrich Bauer, Technical University of Munich
- Gerrit Bleumer, Francotyp-Postalia
- Dan Boneh, Stanford University
- Pascale Charpin, INRIA-Rocquencourt
- Claude Crepeau, McGill University
- Yvo G. Desmedt, University College London (University of London)
- Grigory Kabatiansky, Institute for Information Transmission Problems
- Burt Kaliski, RSA Security
- Peter Landrock, University of Aarhus
- Patrick Drew McDaniel, Penn State University
- Alfred Menezes, University of Waterloo
- David Naccache, Gemplus
- Christof Paar, Ruhr University Bochum
- Bart Preneel, Katholieke Universiteit Leuven
- Jean-Jacques Quisquater, Université Catholique de Louvain
- Kazue Sako, NEC Corporation
- Berry Schoenmakers, Technische Universiteit Eindhoven
