= Paulo S. L. M. Barreto =

Brazilian-American cryptographer (born 1965)

Paulo Barreto
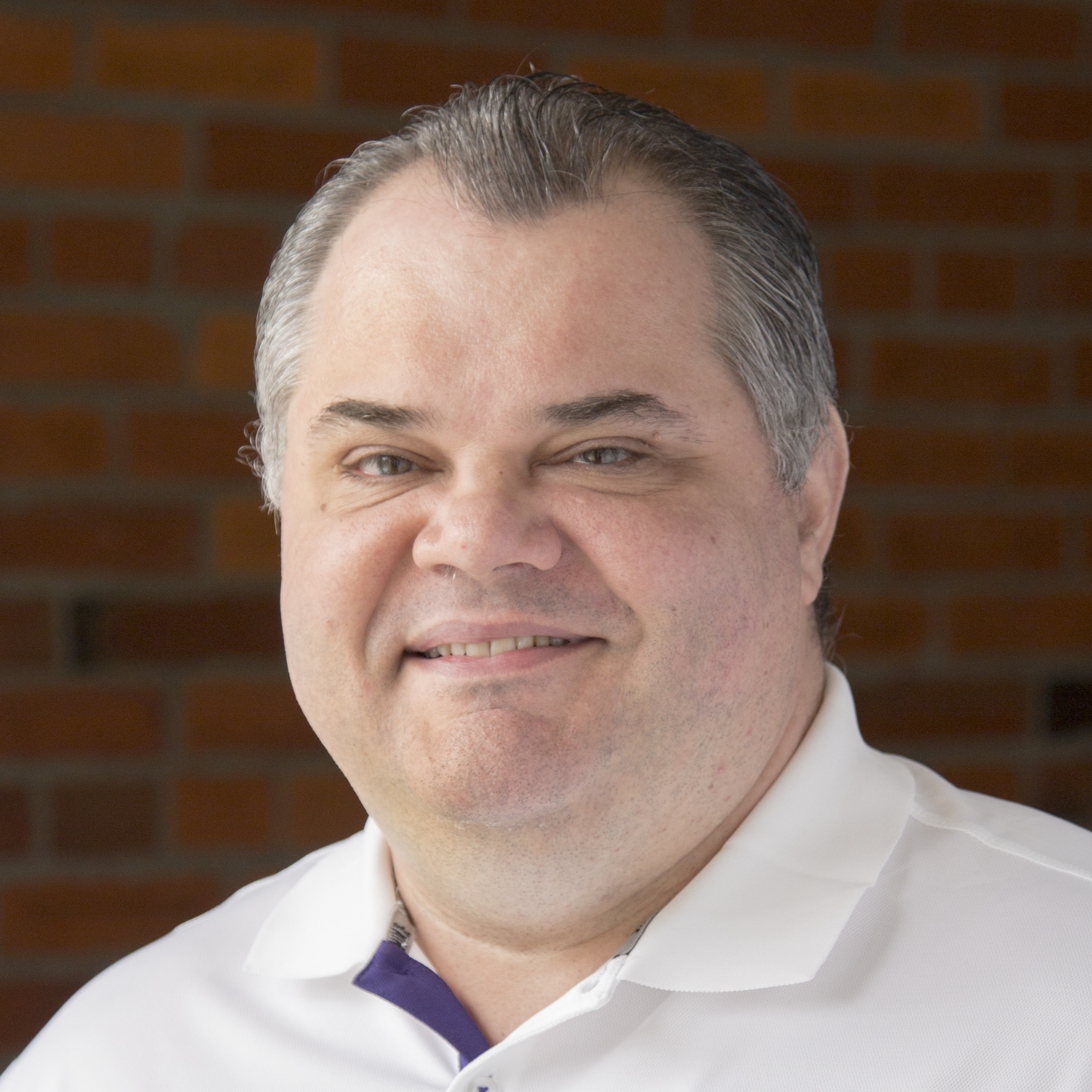
- Paulo Barreto in 2015
- Born: 19 November 1965 (age 60); Salvador, Bahia, Brazil
- Citizenship: Brazil (1965-present); United States (2022-present)
- Education: University of São Paulo
- Known for: Cryptographic hash functions, Pairing-based cryptography, Post-quantum cryptography
- Scientific career
- Fields: Cryptography
- Workplaces: Escola Politécnica, University of São Paulo School of Engineering and Technology, University of Washington Tacoma
- Thesis: (2003)
- Website: directory.tacoma.uw.edu/employee/pbarreto

Paulo Licciardi Barreto (born Paulo Sérgio Licciardi Messeder Barreto on November 19, 1965) is a Brazilian-American cryptographer and one of the designers of the Whirlpool hash function and the block ciphers Anubis and KHAZAD, together with Vincent Rijmen. He has also co-authored a number of research works on elliptic curve cryptography and pairing-based cryptography, including the eta pairing technique, identity-based cryptographic protocols, and the family of Barreto–Naehrig (BN) and Barreto–Lynn-Scott (BLS) pairing-friendly elliptic curves. More recently he has been focusing his research on post-quantum cryptography, being one of the discoverers of quasi-dyadic codes and quasi-cyclic moderate-density parity-check (QC-MDPC) codes to instantiate the McEliece and Niederreiter cryptosystems and related schemes.

His paper "Efficient Algorithms for Pairing-Based Cryptosystems", jointly written with Hae Y. Kim, Ben Lynn and Mike Scott and presented at the Crypto 2002 conference, has been identified in March 2005 as a "Hot Paper", and in December 2005 as "Fast Breaking Paper", by Thomson ISI's Essential Science Indicators (now Science Watch), by virtue of being among the top one-tenth of one percent (0.1%) most cited papers and by having the largest percentage increase in citations in the Computer Science category.

Barreto was born in Salvador, capital of the northeastern state of Bahia, Brazil. In 1987, he graduated in physics at the University of São Paulo. He subsequently worked at Unisys Brazil Ltd and Scopus Tecnologia S/A as a software developer and then as chief cryptographer. Barreto received his Ph.D. degree in 2003. He has been awarded the SFI E. T. S. Walton Award 2008–2009. He was associate professor at the Department of Computer and Digital Systems Engineering, Escola Politécnica, University of São Paulo. He is currently a professor at the School of Engineering and Technology of the University of Washington Tacoma.
