= Cryptologia =

- Discipline: Cryptology
- Language: English
- Edited by: Craig Bauer

Publication details
- Publisher: Taylor & Francis (United Kingdom)
- Frequency: Bimonthly
- Impact factor: 0.933 (2020)

Standard abbreviations
- ISO 4: Cryptologia

Indexing
- ISSN: 0161-1194 (print); 1558-1586 (web)

Cryptologia is a journal in cryptography published six times per year since January 1977. Its remit is all aspects of cryptography, with a special emphasis on historical aspects of the subject. The founding editors were Brian J. Winkel, David Kahn, Louis Kruh, Cipher A. Deavours and Greg Mellen. The current Editor-in-Chief is Craig Bauer.

The journal was initially published at the Rose-Hulman Institute of Technology. In July 1995, it moved to the United States Military Academy, and was then published by Taylor & Francis since the January 2006 issue (Volume 30, Number 1).

== See also ==
- Journal of Cryptology
- Cryptogram
- Cryptology ePrint Archive
