= Whirlpool (hash function) =

Cryptographic hash function

General
- Designers: Vincent Rijmen, Paulo S. L. M. Barreto
- First published: 2000, 2001, 2003
- Derived from: Square, AES
- Certification: NESSIE

Detail
- Digest sizes: 512 bits
- Security claims: Large hashsum size
- Structure: Miyaguchi-Preneel
- Rounds: 10

Best public cryptanalysis
- In 2009, a rebound attack was announced that presents full collisions against 4.5 rounds of Whirlpool in 2^{120} operations, semi-free-start collisions against 5.5 rounds in 2^{120} time and semi-free-start near-collisions against 7.5 rounds in 2^{128} time.

In computer science and cryptography, Whirlpool (sometimes styled WHIRLPOOL) is a cryptographic hash function. It was designed by Vincent Rijmen (co-creator of the Advanced Encryption Standard) and Paulo S. L. M. Barreto, who first described it in 2000. It is named after the Whirlpool galaxy in Canes Venatici (M51, or NGC 5194), the first one recognized to have a spiral structure by William Parsons, third Earl of Rosse, in April 1845.

The hash has been recommended by the NESSIE project. It has also been adopted by the International Organization for Standardization (ISO) and the International Electrotechnical Commission (IEC) as part of the joint ISO/IEC 10118-3 international standard.

== Design features ==
The Whirlpool Galaxy (M51), which inspired the name of the algorithm.

Whirlpool is a hash designed after the Square block cipher, and is considered to be in that family of block cipher functions.

Whirlpool is a Miyaguchi–Preneel construction based on a substantially modified Advanced Encryption Standard (AES).

Whirlpool takes a message of any length less than 2^{256} bits and returns a 512-bit message digest.

The authors have declared that

"WHIRLPOOL is not (and will never be) patented. It may be used free of charge for any purpose."

=== Version changes ===
The original Whirlpool will be called Whirlpool-0, the first revision of Whirlpool will be called Whirlpool-T and the latest version will be called Whirlpool in the following test vectors.

- In the first revision in 2001, the S-box was changed from a randomly generated one with good cryptographic properties to one which has better cryptographic properties and is easier to implement in hardware.
- In the second revision (2003), a flaw in the diffusion matrix was found that lowered the estimated security of the algorithm below its potential. Changing the 8x8 rotating matrix constants from (1, 1, 3, 1, 5, 8, 9, 5) to (1, 1, 4, 1, 8, 5, 2, 9) solved this issue.

== Internal structure ==
The Whirlpool hash function is a Merkle–Damgård construction based on an AES-like block cipher W in Miyaguchi–Preneel mode.

The block cipher $W$ consists of an 8×8 state matrix $S$ of bytes, for a total of 512 bits.

The encryption process consists of updating the state with four round functions over 10 rounds. The four round functions are SubBytes (SB or $\gamma$), ShiftColumns (SC or $\pi$), MixRows (MR or $\theta$) and AddRoundKey (AK or $\sigma[k]$). During each round the new state is computed as $S := \left( AK \circ MR \circ SC \circ SB \right)(S)$.

=== SubBytes ===
The SubBytes operation applies a non-linear permutation (the S-box) to each byte of the state independently. The 8-bit S-box is composed of 3 smaller 4-bit S-boxes.

=== ShiftColumns ===
The ShiftColumns operation cyclically shifts each byte in each column of the state. Column j has its bytes shifted downwards by j positions.

=== MixBytesInRows ===
The MixBytesInRows operation is a right-multiplication of each row by an 8×8 matrix over $GF({2^8})$. The matrix is chosen such that the branch number (an important property when looking at resistance to differential cryptanalysis) is 9, which is maximal.

=== AddRoundKey ===
The AddRoundKey operation uses bitwise xor to add a key calculated by the key schedule to the current state. The key schedule is identical to the encryption itself, except the AddRoundKey function is replaced by an AddRoundConstant function that adds a predetermined constant in each round.

== Complete process of the Whirlpool algorithm ==
Here is the detailed explanation of the Whirlpool algorithm as described in the official release paper.

First, let's define the notation used:

- Every number used is an 8-bit (1 byte) integer.
- $\{0, 1\}^n$ is a n-bit binary string.
- $\mathcal{M}_{n \times m}$ is an n-by-m matrix of bytes.
- $f: A \to B$ is a function that maps elements from set A to set B.
- $a \oplus b$ is the bitwise XOR of $a$ and $b$.
  If $a$ and $b$ are matrices, the XOR is applied element-wise ($a \oplus b = c \ \Leftrightarrow \ c_{i,j} = a_{i,j} \oplus b_{i,j}$).
- $f \circ g$ is the composition function of $f$ and $g$ such that $\left(f \circ g\right)\left(x\right) = g\left(f\left(x\right)\right)$;
- ${\underset{k=m}\overset{n}{\bigcirc}} \alpha_k, \ \forall \left(m; n; k\right) \in \mathbb{Z}^3, \ m \leq k \leq n$ is the ascending repetition of $\alpha_m \circ \alpha_{m + 1} \circ \ldots \circ \alpha_{n - 1} \circ \alpha_n$;
- ${\underset{m}\overset{k=n}{\bigcirc}} \alpha_k, \ \forall \left(m; n; k\right) \in \mathbb{Z}^3, \ m \leq k \leq n$ is the descending repetition of $\alpha_n \circ \alpha_{n - 1} \circ \ldots \circ \alpha_{m + 1} \circ \alpha_m$.

=== Whirlpool algorithm ===
The message $M$ that is to be hashed is first padded to ensure its length is a multiple of the block size (512 bits). This is done using the standard padding scheme defined in the ISO/IEC 10118-1 standard (the same used for md5, sha-2, and others):

1. Append a '1' bit;
2. Append as many '0' bits as needed for the length to reach a multiple of 256 ($512-256$);
3. Append the original length of the message in bits using 256-bit big-endian format.

Then, the padded message is divided into $t$ 512-bit blocks $m_i$, $1 \leq i \leq t$.

Whirlpool iterates the Miyaguchi-Preneel hashing scheme over these blocks ^{[sections 3.11 and 3.12]}:

$$\begin{align}
& \begin{align}
\eta_i & = \mu\left(m_i\right), \\
H_0 & = \mu\left(IV\right), \\
H_i & = W\left[H_{i-1}\right]\left(\eta_i\right) \oplus H_{i-1} \oplus \eta_i, \ 1 \leq i \leq t \\
\end{align} \\
& \text{Whirlpool}\left(M\right) \equiv \mu^{-1}\left(H_t\right)
\end{align}$$

Where:

- $\mu: \{0, 1\}^{512} \to \mathcal{M}_{8 \times 8}$ is the string to matrix conversion function;
- $\mu^{-1}: \mathcal{M}_{8 \times 8} \to \{0, 1\}^{512}$ is the matrix to string conversion function;
- $IV$ is the initialization vector, a string of 512 0-bits;
- $W$ is the Whirlpool cipher function.

=== Cipher W ===
The internal block cipher function $W\left[\mathcal{M}_{8 \times 8}\right]: \mathcal{M}_{8 \times 8} \to \mathcal{M}_{8 \times 8}$ ^{[section 3.9]} operates on and returns an 8x8 matrix:

$$\begin{align}
W\left[K\right] = \left( {\underset{1}\overset{r=R}{\bigcirc}} \rho\left[K_r\right] \right) \circ \sigma\left[K_0\right]
\end{align}$$

Where:

- $R$ is the number of rounds (the standard Whirlpool uses $R = 10$);
- $K_n$ is the nth key of the $K$ key schedule;
- $\rho$ is the round function.

The key schedule expands the key $K \in \mathcal{M}_{8 \times 8}$ into a sequence of keys $K_r \in \mathcal{M}_{8 \times 8}, \ 0 \leq r \leq R$ ^{[section 3.8]}:

$$\begin{align}
K_0 & = K, \\
K_r & = \rho\left[c^r\right]\left(K_{r-1}\right), \ 1 \leq r \leq R \\
\end{align}$$

Where:

- $c^r \in \mathcal{M}_{8 \times 8}$ is the rth round constant matrix.

The round constant for the rth round, $r > 0$, is a matrix $c^r \in \mathcal{M}_{8 \times 8}$, defined as:

$$\begin{align}
c^r_{0, j} & = S\left[8\left(r - 1\right) + j\right], & 0 \leq j < 8 \\
c^r_{i, j} & = 0, & 1 \leq i < 8, 0 \leq j < 8 \\
\end{align}$$

Where:

- $S \in \mathcal{M}_{16 \times 16}$ is the S-box.

=== Round function ρ ===
The round function $\rho\left[\mathcal{M}_{8 \times 8}\right]: \mathcal{M}_{8 \times 8} \to \mathcal{M}_{8 \times 8}$ ^{[section 3.7]} is defined as:

$$\begin{align}
\rho\left[k\right] & = \sigma\left[k\right] \circ \theta \circ \pi \circ \gamma \\
& _{\left( = \ AK \ \circ \ MR \ \circ \ SC \ \circ \ SB \right)} \\
\end{align}$$

Where:

- $\gamma$ is the non-linear layer;
- $\pi$ is the cyclical permutation;
- $\theta$ is the diffusion layer;
- $\sigma$ is the key addition.

==== Non-linear layer γ (SubBytes) ====
The function $\gamma: \mathcal{M}_{8 \times 8} \to \mathcal{M}_{8 \times 8}$ consists of the parallel application of a non-linear substitution $\psi: x_{\text{(Byte)}} \to S\left[x\right]_{\text{(Byte)}}$ to each bytes of the argument independently ^{[section 3.2]}:

$$\begin{align}
\gamma\left(a\right) = b \ \Leftrightarrow \ b_{i, j} = S\left[a_{i, j}\right], \ 0 \leq i < 8, \ 0 \leq j < 8, \\
\end{align}$$

==== Cyclical permutation π (ShiftColumns) ====
The permutation $\pi : \mathcal{M}_{8 \times 8} \to \mathcal{M}_{8 \times 8}$ cyclically shifts each column of its argument independently, so that column $j$ is shifted downwards by $j$ positions ^{[section 3.3]}:

$$\begin{align}
\pi\left(a\right) = b \ \Leftrightarrow \ b_{i, j} = a_{\left( \left(i - j\right) \ \text{mod} \ 8 \right), \ j}, \ 0 \leq i < 8, \ 0 \leq j < 8 \\
\end{align}$$

==== Diffusion layer θ (MixBytesInRows) ====
The linear diffusion layer $\theta: \mathcal{M}_{8 \times 8} \to \mathcal{M}_{8 \times 8}$ is a linear mapping based on the circular matrix $C = \text{cir}\left(01_{(16)}, 01_{(16)}, 04_{(16)}, 01_{(16)}, 08_{(16)}, 05_{(16)}, 02_{(16)}, 09_{(16)}\right)$ ^{[section 3.4]}:

$$\begin{align}
\theta\left(a\right) = a \cdot C, \ 0 \leq i < 8, \ 0 \leq j < 8 \\
\end{align}$$

A circulant matrix $C\in\mathcal{M}_{n\times n}$ is defined as a matrix where each row is a cyclic shift of the previous row ^{[section 2.2]}. Formally, a circulant matrix can be represented as:

$$\begin{align}
& \text{cir}(a_0, a_1, \ldots, a_{n-1}) =
\begin{pmatrix}
a_0 & a_1 & a_2 & \cdots & a_{n-1} \\
a_{n-1} & a_0 & a_1 & \cdots & a_{n-2} \\
a_{n-2} & a_{n-1} & a_0 & \cdots & a_{n-3} \\
\vdots & \vdots & \vdots & \ddots & \vdots \\
a_1 & a_2 & a_3 & \cdots & a_0 \\
\end{pmatrix}, \ \forall a_n \in \mathbb{F}_{2^8}, \ n \in \mathbb{N} \\
& \text{or simply} \\
& \text{cir}(a_0, a_1, \ldots, a_{n-1}) = c \ \Leftrightarrow \ c_{i, j} = a_{\left(i - j\right) \ \text{mod} \ 8}, \ 0 \leq i < 8, \ 0 \leq j < 8, \ \forall a_n \in \mathbb{F}_{2^8}, \ n \in \mathbb{N} \\
\end{align}$$

For example, circulant matrix $C = \text{cir}\left(01_{(16)}, 01_{(16)}, 04_{(16)}, 01_{(16)}, 08_{(16)}, 05_{(16)}, 02_{(16)}, 09_{(16)}\right)$ is the matrix:

$$\begin{align}
C =
\begin{pmatrix}
01_{(16)} & 01_{(16)} & 04_{(16)} & 01_{(16)} & 08_{(16)} & 05_{(16)} & 02_{(16)} & 09_{(16)} \\
09_{(16)} & 01_{(16)} & 01_{(16)} & 04_{(16)} & 01_{(16)} & 08_{(16)} & 05_{(16)} & 02_{(16)} \\
02_{(16)} & 09_{(16)} & 01_{(16)} & 01_{(16)} & 04_{(16)} & 01_{(16)} & 08_{(16)} & 05_{(16)} \\
05_{(16)} & 02_{(16)} & 09_{(16)} & 01_{(16)} & 01_{(16)} & 04_{(16)} & 01_{(16)} & 08_{(16)} \\
08_{(16)} & 05_{(16)} & 02_{(16)} & 09_{(16)} & 01_{(16)} & 01_{(16)} & 04_{(16)} & 01_{(16)} \\
01_{(16)} & 08_{(16)} & 05_{(16)} & 02_{(16)} & 09_{(16)} & 01_{(16)} & 01_{(16)} & 04_{(16)} \\
04_{(16)} & 01_{(16)} & 08_{(16)} & 05_{(16)} & 02_{(16)} & 09_{(16)} & 01_{(16)} & 01_{(16)} \\
01_{(16)} & 04_{(16)} & 01_{(16)} & 08_{(16)} & 05_{(16)} & 02_{(16)} & 09_{(16)} & 01_{(16)} \\
\end{pmatrix} \\
\end{align}$$

==== Key addition σ (AddRoundKey) ====
The affine key addition $\sigma\left[\mathcal{M}_{8 \times 8}\right]: \mathcal{M}_{8 \times 8} \to \mathcal{M}_{8 \times 8}$ consists of the bitwise XOR of a key matrix $k \in \mathcal{K}_{8 \times 8}$:

$$\begin{align}
\sigma\left[k\right]\left(a\right) = a \oplus k \\
\end{align}$$

=== Substitution box S (S-Box) ===
The S-Box $S \in \mathcal{M}_{16 \times 16}$ is typically represented as a lookup table, where each input byte is mapped to a corresponding output byte. It can be computed using optimal diffusion mapping generation techniques^{[section 2.4]} but here is a matrix representation of it:
$$\begin{align}
& S =
\begin{pmatrix}
18_{(16)} & 23_{(16)} & c6_{(16)} & e8_{(16)} & 87_{(16)} & b8_{(16)} & 01_{(16)} & 4f_{(16)} & 36_{(16)} & a6_{(16)} & d2_{(16)} & f5_{(16)} & 79_{(16)} & 6f_{(16)} & 91_{(16)} & 52_{(16)} \\
60_{(16)} & bc_{(16)} & 9b_{(16)} & 8e_{(16)} & a3_{(16)} & 0c_{(16)} & 7b_{(16)} & 35_{(16)} & 1d_{(16)} & e0_{(16)} & d7_{(16)} & c2_{(16)} & 2e_{(16)} & 4b_{(16)} & fe_{(16)} & 57_{(16)} \\
15_{(16)} & 77_{(16)} & 37_{(16)} & e5_{(16)} & 9f_{(16)} & f0_{(16)} & 4a_{(16)} & da_{(16)} & 58_{(16)} & c9_{(16)} & 29_{(16)} & 0a_{(16)} & b1_{(16)} & a0_{(16)} & 6b_{(16)} & 85_{(16)} \\
bd_{(16)} & 5d_{(16)} & 10_{(16)} & f4_{(16)} & cb_{(16)} & 3e_{(16)} & 05_{(16)} & 67_{(16)} & e4_{(16)} & 27_{(16)} & 41_{(16)} & 8b_{(16)} & a7_{(16)} & 7d_{(16)} & 95_{(16)} & d8_{(16)} \\
fb_{(16)} & ee_{(16)} & 7c_{(16)} & 66_{(16)} & dd_{(16)} & 17_{(16)} & 47_{(16)} & 9e_{(16)} & ca_{(16)} & 2d_{(16)} & bf_{(16)} & 07_{(16)} & ad_{(16)} & 5a_{(16)} & 83_{(16)} & 33_{(16)} \\
63_{(16)} & 02_{(16)} & aa_{(16)} & 71_{(16)} & c8_{(16)} & 19_{(16)} & 49_{(16)} & d9_{(16)} & f2_{(16)} & e3_{(16)} & 5b_{(16)} & 88_{(16)} & 9a_{(16)} & 26_{(16)} & 32_{(16)} & b0_{(16)} \\
e9_{(16)} & 0f_{(16)} & d5_{(16)} & 80_{(16)} & be_{(16)} & cd_{(16)} & 34_{(16)} & 48_{(16)} & ff_{(16)} & 7a_{(16)} & 90_{(16)} & 5f_{(16)} & 20_{(16)} & 68_{(16)} & 1a_{(16)} & ae_{(16)} \\
b4_{(16)} & 54_{(16)} & 93_{(16)} & 22_{(16)} & 64_{(16)} & f1_{(16)} & 73_{(16)} & 12_{(16)} & 40_{(16)} & 08_{(16)} & c3_{(16)} & ec_{(16)} & db_{(16)} & a1_{(16)} & 8d_{(16)} & 3d_{(16)} \\
97_{(16)} & 00_{(16)} & cf_{(16)} & 2b_{(16)} & 76_{(16)} & 82_{(16)} & d6_{(16)} & 1b_{(16)} & b5_{(16)} & af_{(16)} & 6a_{(16)} & 50_{(16)} & 45_{(16)} & f3_{(16)} & 30_{(16)} & ef_{(16)} \\
3f_{(16)} & 55_{(16)} & a2_{(16)} & ea_{(16)} & 65_{(16)} & ba_{(16)} & 2f_{(16)} & c0_{(16)} & de_{(16)} & 1c_{(16)} & fd_{(16)} & 4d_{(16)} & 92_{(16)} & 75_{(16)} & 06_{(16)} & 8a_{(16)} \\
b2_{(16)} & e6_{(16)} & 0e_{(16)} & 1f_{(16)} & 62_{(16)} & d4_{(16)} & a8_{(16)} & 96_{(16)} & f9_{(16)} & c5_{(16)} & 25_{(16)} & 59_{(16)} & 84_{(16)} & 72_{(16)} & 39_{(16)} & 4c_{(16)} \\
5e_{(16)} & 78_{(16)} & 38_{(16)} & 8c_{(16)} & d1_{(16)} & a5_{(16)} & e2_{(16)} & 61_{(16)} & b3_{(16)} & 21_{(16)} & 9c_{(16)} & 1e_{(16)} & 43_{(16)} & c7_{(16)} & fc_{(16)} & 04_{(16)} \\
51_{(16)} & 99_{(16)} & 6d_{(16)} & 0d_{(16)} & fa_{(16)} & df_{(16)} & 7e_{(16)} & 24_{(16)} & 3b_{(16)} & ab_{(16)} & ce_{(16)} & 11_{(16)} & 8f_{(16)} & 4e_{(16)} & b7_{(16)} & eb_{(16)} \\
3c_{(16)} & 81_{(16)} & 94_{(16)} & f7_{(16)} & b9_{(16)} & 13_{(16)} & 2c_{(16)} & d3_{(16)} & e7_{(16)} & 6e_{(16)} & c4_{(16)} & 03_{(16)} & 56_{(16)} & 44_{(16)} & 7f_{(16)} & a9_{(16)} \\
2a_{(16)} & bb_{(16)} & c1_{(16)} & 53_{(16)} & dc_{(16)} & 0b_{(16)} & 9d_{(16)} & 6c_{(16)} & 31_{(16)} & 74_{(16)} & f6_{(16)} & 46_{(16)} & ac_{(16)} & 89_{(16)} & 14_{(16)} & e1_{(16)} \\
16_{(16)} & 3a_{(16)} & 69_{(16)} & 09_{(16)} & 70_{(16)} & b6_{(16)} & d0_{(16)} & ed_{(16)} & cc_{(16)} & 42_{(16)} & 98_{(16)} & a4_{(16)} & 28_{(16)} & 5c_{(16)} & f8_{(16)} & 86_{(16)} \\
\end{pmatrix} \\
\end{align}$$

== Whirlpool hashes ==
The Whirlpool algorithm has undergone two revisions since its original 2000 specification.

People incorporating Whirlpool will most likely use the most recent revision of Whirlpool; while there are no known security weaknesses in earlier versions of Whirlpool, the most recent revision has better hardware implementation efficiency characteristics, and is also likely to be more secure. As mentioned earlier, it is also the version adopted in the ISO/IEC 10118-3 international standard.

The 512-bit (64-byte) Whirlpool hashes (also termed message digests) are typically represented as 128-digit hexadecimal numbers.
The following demonstrates a 43-byte ASCII input (not including quotes) and the corresponding Whirlpool hashes:

Version	Input String	Computed Hash
Whirlpool-0	"The quick brown fox jumps over the lazy dog"	4F8F5CB531E3D49A61CF417CD133792CCFA501FD8DA53EE368FED20E5FE0248C  3A0B64F98A6533CEE1DA614C3A8DDEC791FF05FEE6D971D57C1348320F4EB42D
Whirlpool-T	"The quick brown fox jumps over the lazy dog"	3CCF8252D8BBB258460D9AA999C06EE38E67CB546CFFCF48E91F700F6FC7C183  AC8CC3D3096DD30A35B01F4620A1E3A20D79CD5168544D9E1B7CDF49970E87F1
Whirlpool	"The quick brown fox jumps over the lazy dog"	B97DE512E91E3828B40D2B0FDCE9CEB3C4A71F9BEA8D88E75C4FA854DF36725F  D2B52EB6544EDCACD6F8BEDDFEA403CB55AE31F03AD62A5EF54E42EE82C3FB35

== Implementations ==
The authors provide reference implementations of the Whirlpool algorithm, including a version written in C and a version written in Java. These reference implementations have been released into the public domain.

Research on the security analysis of the Whirlpool function however, has revealed that on average, the introduction of 8 random faults is sufficient to compromise the 512-bit Whirlpool hash message being processed and the secret key of HMAC-Whirlpool within the context of Cloud of Things (CoTs). This emphasizes the need for increased security measures in its implementation.

=== Pseudo-code ===
Here is an implementation example of the standard Whirlpool algorithm:

S :=  0x18, 0x23, 0xc6, 0xe8, 0x87, 0xb8, 0x01, 0x4f, 0x36, 0xa6, 0xd2, 0xf5, 0x79, 0x6f, 0x91, 0x52, \
      0x60, 0xbc, 0x9b, 0x8e, 0xa3, 0x0c, 0x7b, 0x35, 0x1d, 0xe0, 0xd7, 0xc2, 0x2e, 0x4b, 0xfe, 0x57, \
      0x15, 0x77, 0x37, 0xe5, 0x9f, 0xf0, 0x4a, 0xda, 0x58, 0xc9, 0x29, 0x0a, 0xb1, 0xa0, 0x6b, 0x85, \
      0xbd, 0x5d, 0x10, 0xf4, 0xcb, 0x3e, 0x05, 0x67, 0xe4, 0x27, 0x41, 0x8b, 0xa7, 0x7d, 0x95, 0xd8, \
      0xfb, 0xee, 0x7c, 0x66, 0xdd, 0x17, 0x47, 0x9e, 0xca, 0x2d, 0xbf, 0x07, 0xad, 0x5a, 0x83, 0x33, \
      0x63, 0x02, 0xaa, 0x71, 0xc8, 0x19, 0x49, 0xd9, 0xf2, 0xe3, 0x5b, 0x88, 0x9a, 0x26, 0x32, 0xb0, \
      0xe9, 0x0f, 0xd5, 0x80, 0xbe, 0xcd, 0x34, 0x48, 0xff, 0x7a, 0x90, 0x5f, 0x20, 0x68, 0x1a, 0xae, \
      0xb4, 0x54, 0x93, 0x22, 0x64, 0xf1, 0x73, 0x12, 0x40, 0x08, 0xc3, 0xec, 0xdb, 0xa1, 0x8d, 0x3d, \
      0x97, 0x00, 0xcf, 0x2b, 0x76, 0x82, 0xd6, 0x1b, 0xb5, 0xaf, 0x6a, 0x50, 0x45, 0xf3, 0x30, 0xef, \
      0x3f, 0x55, 0xa2, 0xea, 0x65, 0xba, 0x2f, 0xc0, 0xde, 0x1c, 0xfd, 0x4d, 0x92, 0x75, 0x06, 0x8a, \
      0xb2, 0xe6, 0x0e, 0x1f, 0x62, 0xd4, 0xa8, 0x96, 0xf9, 0xc5, 0x25, 0x59, 0x84, 0x72, 0x39, 0x4c, \
      0x5e, 0x78, 0x38, 0x8c, 0xd1, 0xa5, 0xe2, 0x61, 0xb3, 0x21, 0x9c, 0x1e, 0x43, 0xc7, 0xfc, 0x04, \
      0x51, 0x99, 0x6d, 0x0d, 0xfa, 0xdf, 0x7e, 0x24, 0x3b, 0xab, 0xce, 0x11, 0x8f, 0x4e, 0xb7, 0xeb, \
      0x3c, 0x81, 0x94, 0xf7, 0xb9, 0x13, 0x2c, 0xd3, 0xe7, 0x6e, 0xc4, 0x03, 0x56, 0x44, 0x7f, 0xa9, \
      0x2a, 0xbb, 0xc1, 0x53, 0xdc, 0x0b, 0x9d, 0x6c, 0x31, 0x74, 0xf6, 0x46, 0xac, 0x89, 0x14, 0xe1, \
      0x16, 0x3a, 0x69, 0x09, 0x70, 0xb6, 0xd0, 0xed, 0xcc, 0x42, 0x98, 0xa4, 0x28, 0x5c, 0xf8, 0x86

C :=  0x01, 0x01, 0x04, 0x01, 0x08, 0x05, 0x02, 0x09, \
      0x09, 0x01, 0x01, 0x04, 0x01, 0x08, 0x05, 0x02, \
      0x02, 0x09, 0x01, 0x01, 0x04, 0x01, 0x08, 0x05, \
      0x05, 0x02, 0x09, 0x01, 0x01, 0x04, 0x01, 0x08, \
      0x08, 0x05, 0x02, 0x09, 0x01, 0x01, 0x04, 0x01, \
      0x01, 0x08, 0x05, 0x02, 0x09, 0x01, 0x01, 0x04, \
      0x04, 0x01, 0x08, 0x05, 0x02, 0x09, 0x01, 0x01, \
      0x01, 0x04, 0x01, 0x08, 0x05, 0x02, 0x09, 0x01

# Matrix built from initialization vector
IM := 0, 0, 0, 0, 0, 0, 0, 0, \
      0, 0, 0, 0, 0, 0, 0, 0, \
      0, 0, 0, 0, 0, 0, 0, 0, \
      0, 0, 0, 0, 0, 0, 0, 0, \
      0, 0, 0, 0, 0, 0, 0, 0, \
      0, 0, 0, 0, 0, 0, 0, 0, \
      0, 0, 0, 0, 0, 0, 0, 0, \
      0, 0, 0, 0, 0, 0, 0, 0

R :=  10

func getConstantRoundMatrix(r)
    cr := IM
    for j from 0 to 7
        cr[j] := S[8 * (r - 1) + j]
    endfor
    return cr
endfunc

func whirlpoolRound(matrix, key)
    # Apply the non-linear transformation γ
    for i from 0 to 7
        for j from 0 to 7
            matrix[i * 8 + j] = S[matrix[i * 8 + j]]
        endfor
    endfor

    # Apply cyclical permutation π
    tmp := matrix
    for i from 0 to 7
        for j from 0 to 7
            # '+ 8' to prevent negative indices
            matrix[i * 8 + j] = tmp[((i - j + 8) % 8) * 8 + j]
        endfor
    endfor
    matrix := tmp

    # Apply linear diffusion θ
    matrix := dotProduct(matrix, C)

    # Apply key addition σ[key]
    matrix := matrix xor key
    return matrix
endfunc

func whirlpool(M)
    m, t := pad(M)  # Returns (paddedMessageDividedInChunks, amountOfChunks)
    H := IM

    for i from 0 to t
        W := m[t]
        Kr := H

        W := W xor H
        for r from 1 to R
            cr := getConstantRoundMatrix(r)
            Kr := whirlpoolRound(Kr, cr)
            W := whirlpoolRound(W, Kr)
        endfor

        H := H xor W
        H := H xor m[t]
    endfor
    return matrixToHexString(H)
endfunc

For the linear-diffusion $\theta$, a matrix multiplication is required. Galois Field arithmetic can be used to write this multiplication algorithm:

func dotProduct(A, B)
    tmp: Matrix

    for i from 0 to 7
        for j from 0 to 7
            tmp[i * 8 + j] := 0

            for k from 0 to 7
                # Galois Field (2^8) multiplication
                a := A[i * 8 + k];
                b := B[k * 8 + j];
                product := 0;

                while b > 0
                    if b & 1 == 1
                        product := product xor a
                    endif
                    if a & 0x80 != 0
                        a := (a << 1) xor 0x11d  # x^8 + x^4 + x^3 + x^2 + 1
                    else
                        a := a << 1
                    endif
                    b := b >> 1
                endwhile
                tmp[i * 8 + j] := tmp[i * 8 + j] xor product
            endfor
        endfor
    endfor
    return tmp
endfunc

Here is an implementation of the 512-bit (64-bits size, big-endian) padding:

func pad(M)
    original_length := len(M)  # In bytes

    # 512 bits (total length) - 256 bits (size length) - 1 bit (padding bit)
    #  64 bytes               -  32 bytes              - 1 byte = 31 bytes
    padding := (31 - original_length) % 64
    padding := (padding + 64) % 64  # Avoid negative padding

    total_length := original_length + 1 + padding + 32  # In bytes
    padded: Byte[total_length]

    # Copy original message
    for i from 0 to original_length - 1
        padded[i] := M[i]
    endfor

    padded[original_length] := 0x80  # Append the '1' bit, then 7 '0' bits
    for i from original_length + 1 to original_length + padding
        padded[i] := 0x00  # Append 8 '0' bits
    endfor

    for i from 0 to 31
        padded[total_length - 32 + i] := (original_length * 8) >> (8 * (31 - i)) & 0xff
    endfor

    chunk_amount := total_length / 64
    divided := Byte[chunk_amount][64]
    for i from 0 to chunk_amount - 1
        for j from 0 to 63
            divided[i][j] := padded[i * 64 + j]
        endfor
    endfor
    return divided, chunk_amount
endfunc

And here is an example of a matrix-to-string conversion:

func matrixToHexString(matrix)
    HEX := "0123456789abcdef"
    result: Byte[128]
    for i from 0 to 63
        byte := matrix[i]
        result[i * 2] := HEX[byte >> 4]
        result[i * 2 + 1] := HEX[byte & 0xf]
    endfor
    return result
endfunc

== Adoption ==
Two of the first widely used mainstream cryptographic programs that started using Whirlpool were FreeOTFE, followed by TrueCrypt in 2005.

VeraCrypt (a fork of TrueCrypt) included Whirlpool (the final version) as one of its supported hash algorithms.

== See also ==
- Digital timestamping
