= Nigel Smart (cryptographer) =

British cryptographer

- Born: 22 October 1967 (age 58); United Kingdom
- Education: University of Reading (BSc); University of Kent (PhD)
- Known for: ECC; Work on the ECDLP problem Pairing-based cryptography Efficient Secure multi-party computation Fully homomorphic encryption
- Scientific career
- Fields: Cryptography
- Workplaces: Katholieke Universiteit Leuven
- Doctoral advisor: John Merriman
- Website: nigelsmart.github.io

Nigel Smart is a professor at COSIC at the Katholieke Universiteit Leuven and Chief Cryptographer at Zama. He is a cryptographer with interests in the theory of cryptography and its application in practice.

== Education ==
Smart received a BSc degree in mathematics from the University of Reading in 1989.

He then obtained his PhD degree from the University of Kent at Canterbury in 1992; his thesis was titled The Computer Solutions of Diophantine Equations.

== Career ==
Smart proceeded to work as a research fellow at the University of Kent, the Erasmus University Rotterdam, and Cardiff University until 1995. From 1995 to 1997, he was a lecturer in mathematics at the University of Kent, and then spent three years in industry at Hewlett-Packard from 1997 to 2000. From 2000 to 2017 he was at the University of Bristol, where he founded the cryptology research group. From 2018 he has been based in the COSIC group at the Katholieke Universiteit Leuven, where he is now a part-time professor.

Smart held a Royal Society Wolfson Merit Award (2008–2013), and two ERC Advanced Grant (2011–2016 and 2016-2021). He was a director of the International Association for Cryptologic Research (2012–2014), and was elected vice president for the period 2014-2016. In 2016 he was named as a Fellow of the IACR. In 2026 he was awarded the RSA Award for Excellence in Mathematics.

== Research ==
Prof. Smart is known for his work in elliptic curve cryptography, especially work on the ECDLP. He has also worked on pairing-based cryptography contributing a number of algorithms such as the SK-KEM and the Ate-pairing

As well as elliptic curve cryptography, his work has been instrumental in the effort to make secure multiparty computation practical. A few of his works in this direction include.

His work with Gentry and Halevi on performing the first large calculation using Fully Homomorphic Encryption won the IBM Pat Goldberg Best Paper Award for 2012.

In addition to his three years at HP Laboratories, Smart was a founder of the startup Identum specialising in pairing based cryptography and identity based encryption. This was bought by Trend Micro in 2008. In 2013 he formed, with Yehuda Lindell, Unbound Security (formally called Dyadic Security), a company focusing on deploying distributed cryptographic solutions based on multi-party computations. Unbound Security was bought by Coinbase in 2021.

He is also the co-founder, along with Kenny Paterson, of the Real World Crypto conference series.

=== Publications ===
- Nigel P. Smart (1998). The Algorithmic Resolution of Diophantine Equations. Cambridge University Press. ISBN 978-0-521-64633-8.
- Ian F. Blake, Gadiel Seroussi and Nigel P. Smart (1999). Elliptic Curves in Cryptography. Cambridge University Press. ISBN 978-0-521-65374-9.
- Nigel P. Smart (2002). Cryptography An Introduction. McGraw Hill. ISBN 978-0-07-709987-9.
- I.F. Blake; G. Seroussi & Nigel P. Smart (2004). Advances in Elliptic Curve Cryptography. Cambridge University Press. ISBN 978-0-521-60415-4.
- Nigel P. Smart, ed. (2005). Cryptography and Coding. Springer-Verlag, LNCS 3796. ISBN 978-3-540-30276-6.
- Nigel P. Smart, ed. (2008). Advances in Cryptology - Eurocrypt 2008. Springer-Verlag, LNCS 4965. ISBN 978-3-540-78966-6.
- Daniel Page & Nigel P. Smart (2014). What Is Computer Science? An Information Security Perspective. Springer-Verlag. ISBN 978-3-319-04041-7.
- Nigel P. Smart (2015). Cryptography Made Simple. Springer International Publishing. ISBN 978-3-319-21935-6.
- Arpita Patra & Nigel P. Smart (2017). Progress in Cryptology - INDOCRYPT 2017. Springer-Verlag. ISBN 978-3-319-71667-1.
