= Cachin =

Cachin is a surname. Notable people with the surname include:

- Christian Cachin, Swiss cryptographer
- Françoise Cachin (1936–2011), French art historian
- Joseph Cachin (1757–1825), French engineer
- Pedro Cachin (born 1995), Argentine tennis player
- Marcel Cachin (1869–1958), French politician
