= Tom Berson =

American cryptographer & computer science researcher (born 1946)

Thomas Alan Berson (born 1946) is a cryptographer and computer security researcher. His notable work includes, several cryptanalytic attacks, and research in the practical use of cryptographic protocols, particularly, computer networks.

A founding member of the International Association for Cryptologic Research, Tom Berson has been one of its officers since 1983, and was the first person selected as an IACR Fellow. He served as editor of the Journal of Cryptology from 1986 to 2001. At ASIACRYPT 2000, he delivered the IACR Distinguished Lecture, Cryptography Everywhere.

Berson was elected as a member of the National Academy of Engineering in 2020, for contributions to cybersecurity in the commercial and intelligence communities. He serves on the advisory board of Salesforce.
