= Kenny Paterson =

British cryptographer

Kenneth G. "Kenny" Paterson (born 2 March 1969) is a professor in the Institute of Information Security at ETH Zurich, where he leads the Applied Cryptography Group. Before joining ETH Zurich in April 2019, he was a professor in the Information Security Group at Royal Holloway, University of London and an EPSRC Leadership Fellow. He is a cryptographer with a focus on bridging the gap between theory and practice and recently became the Editor in Chief for the IACR's Journal of Cryptology and a 2017 fellow of the IACR.

== Education ==
Paterson obtained a BSc in 1990 from the University of Glasgow and a PhD from Royal Holloway, University of London in 1993, both in Mathematics. His doctoral advisor was Fred Piper.

== Career ==
Paterson was a Royal Society Fellow at Institute for Signal and Information Processing at ETH Zurich from 1993 to 1994. In 1996, he joined Hewlett-Packard Laboratories Bristol. He then joined the Information Security Group at Royal Holloway in 2001, becoming a Reader in 2002 and Professor in 2004. From March 2010 to May 2015, he was an EPSRC Leadership Fellow working on a project entitled "Cryptography: Bridging Theory and Practice". In May 2015, he returned to working as a professor. He became the Editor in Chief for the IACR's Journal of Cryptology.

== Research ==
Paterson is notable for attacks on the Encapsulating Security Payload in IPSec, the Lucky 13 attack on TLS, attacks on the use of RC4 in TLS and on use of CBC mode in the SSH protocol. He also worked on improved security models proving protocols secure against such attacks.

=== Awards ===
- Distinguished Paper Award for work with Nadhem AlFardan presenting plaintext recovery attacks against DTLS published at NDSS 2012
- Applied Networking Research Prize from the IRTF for work with Nadhem AlFardan on the Lucky 13 attack
- Award for Outstanding Research in Privacy Enhancing Technologies for work with Mihir Bellare and Phil Rogaway on the Security of symmetric encryption against mass surveillance published at CRYPTO 2014.
- Best Paper Award at ACM CCS 2016 for work with Martin Albrecht, Jean Paul Degabriele and Torben Hansen on symmetric encryption in SSH
