= Ingrid Verbauwhede =

Computer scientist

Ingrid Verbauwhede is a professor at the COSIC (Computer Security and Industrial Cryptography) Research Group of the Electrical Engineering Department, KU Leuven, where she leads the embedded systems team. She is a pioneer in the field of secure embedded circuits and systems, with several awards recognising her contributions to the field. She is member of the Royal Flemish Academy of Belgium for Science and the Arts since 2011. She is a fellow of IEEE.

== Education ==
Verbauwhede received her PhD degree in Electrical Engineering from the Katholieke Universiteit Leuven (KU Leuven), Leuven, Belgium, and Interuniversity Microelectronics Centre (IMEC), Leuven, in 1991. Her PhD dissertation was on "VLSI design methodologies for application-specific cryptographic and algebraic systems".

== Career ==
Verbauwhede received a NATO post-doctoral fellowship to work at the Electronics Research Lab of the University of California, Berkeley (Berkeley, United States).

Since 2003, she is part of the COSIC and iMinds research groups in the Department of Electrical Engineering, at KU-Leuven, Belgium. She was also an associate professor at the Electrical Engineering Department, University of California, Los Angeles.

In 2025, she co-founded Belfort Labs, a spin-off of KU Leuven specialized in the acceleration of Homomorphic Encryption.

== Research ==
Verbauwhede's main research interests are system and architecture design, embedded systems, ASIC and FPGA design and design methodologies for real-time, low power embedded systems and more specifically embedded security systems. Her projects investigate fast, low power encryption platforms, which can also be easily reprogrammed and reconfigured, and how even the lightest devices can be made resistant against security hacks. She advocates security as another design dimension for lightweight devices, e.g., things in IoT (Internet of Things) should be designed and optimized for security.

Verbauwhede is an inventor on several patents in the domains of logic circuits, and digital signal processing, security e.g., Advanced Encryption System (AES) architecture.

She is the author of the book Secure Integrated Circuits and Systems (ISBN 0387718273). She also co-authored the book titled Lattice-Based Public-Key Cryptography in Hardware (Computer Architecture and Design Methodologies) (ISBN 9813299932) with Sujoy Sinha Roy.

== Awards and recognition ==
Verbauwhede was elected as a member of the Royal Flemish Academy of Belgium for Science and the Arts in 2011.

In 2013, she became an IEEE Fellow for contributions to the design of secure integrated circuits and systems.

She received an ERC Advanced Grant in 2016 with her Cathedral project on Post-Snowden Circuits and Design Methods for Security.

In 2017, she received the IEEE CS Technical Achievement Award for pioneering contributions to design methodologies for tamper-resistant and secure electronic systems.

In 2021, she became a fellow of the International Association for Cryptologic Research for pioneering and sustained contributions to cryptographic hardware and embedded systems.
