= SHARK =

Block cipher

General
- Designers: Vincent Rijmen, Joan Daemen, Bart Preneel, Antoon Bosselaers, Erik De Win
- First published: 1996
- Successors: KHAZAD, Rijndael

Cipher detail
- Key sizes: 128 bits
- Block sizes: 64 bits
- Structure: Substitution–permutation network
- Rounds: 6

In cryptography, SHARK is a block cipher identified as one of the predecessors of Rijndael (the Advanced Encryption Standard).

SHARK has a 64-bit block size and a 128-bit key size. It is a six-round SP-network which alternates a key mixing stage with linear and non-linear transformation layers. The linear transformation uses an MDS matrix representing a Reed–Solomon error correcting code in order to guarantee good diffusion. The nonlinear layer is composed of eight 8×8-bit S-boxes based on the function F(x) = x^{−1} over GF(2^{8}).

Five rounds of a modified version of SHARK can be broken using an interpolation attack (Jakobsen and Knudsen, 1997).

== See also ==
- KHAZAD
- Square
