= Renato Renner =

Swiss theoretical quantum physicist and professor

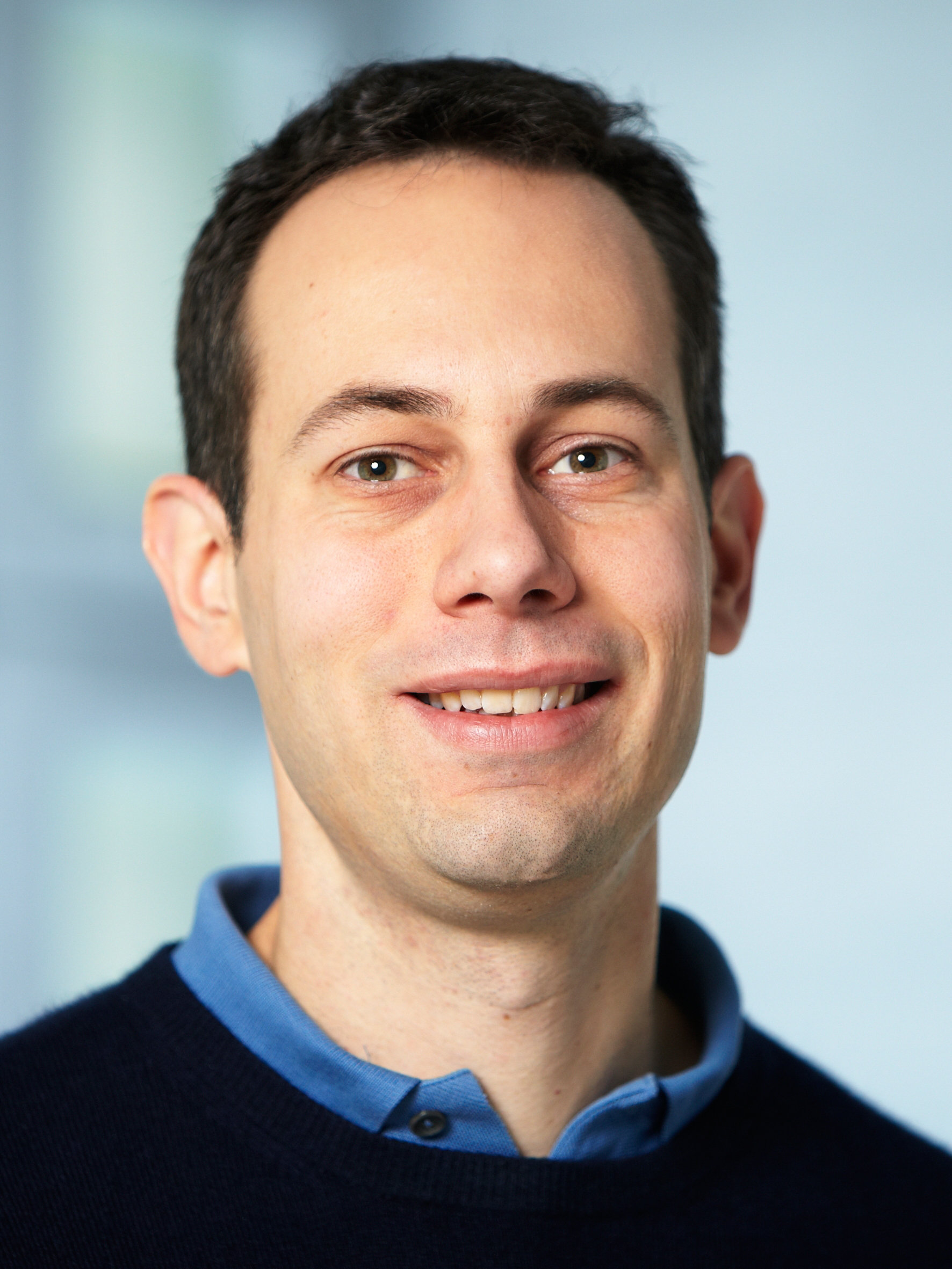
- Renato Renner in 2010
- Born: 11 December 1974 (age 51); Lucerne, Switzerland
- Education: ETH Zurich
- Scientific career
- Thesis: Security of Quantum Key Distribution (2005)
- Doctoral advisor: Ueli Maurer

Renato Renner (born 11 December 1974) is a Swiss professor for Theoretical Physics at the Swiss Federal Institute of Technology (ETH) in Zurich, where he is head of the Research Group for Quantum Information Theory. His research interests include Quantum Information and Computation, the Foundations of Quantum Physics and Quantum thermodynamics.

== Education and career ==
Renner was born 11 December 1974 in Lucerne, Switzerland, where he received his high school degree in 1994 from Kantonsschule. He then went to study physics at the Swiss Federal Institute of Technology in Lausanne (EPFL) and continued his education at the Swiss Federal Institute of Technology (ETH) in Zurich, where he graduated in theoretical physics. Renner then joined ETH's department of Computer Science as a Ph.D. student, where he worked in the field of Quantum Cryptography and specialized in the Security of Quantum Key Distribution, which became the title of his doctoral thesis in 2005. He continued his scientific career with a two-year postdoctoral researcher position at the Department of Applied Mathematics and Theoretical Physics of the University of Cambridge, United Kingdom.

At his return to Switzerland in 2007, Renner started as assistant professor at ETH Zurich and then continued to work from 2012 as associate professor in the Department of Theoretical Physics, where he was promoted to a Full Professor in 2015. He and his team are especially active in the field of Cyber Security.

== Awards ==
- 2018, ALEA Award of the AVETH
- 2017 and 2011, Teaching Award (Golden Owl) from the ETH Zurich Physics Student Association
- 2016, TCC Test of Time Award from the International Association for Cryptologic Research (IACR)
- 2015, Fellowship at the Stellenbosch Institute for Advanced Study
- 2011, CRM Aisenstadt Chair
- 2010 - 2015, ERC Starting Independent Researcher Grant
- Best Dissertation Award by the German Chapter of the Association for Computing Machinery (ACM)
- 2005, ETH Medal for his PhD thesis
