= COSIC =

Research group at KU Leuven

Computer Security and Industrial Cryptography
- Abbreviation: COSIC
- Formation: 1979; 47 years ago
- Purpose: The COSIC research group provides a broad expertise in digital security and strives for innovative security services.
- Location: Kasteelpark Arenberg 10, 3001 Heverlee (Leuven)
- Leader: Bart Preneel; Ingrid Verbauwhede; Vincent Rijmen; Claudia Diaz; Nele Mentens; Fréderik Vercauteren; Nigel Smart
- Main organ: KU Leuven
- Website: www.esat.kuleuven.be/cosic/

The Computer Security and Industrial Cryptography research group, commonly called COSIC, is a research group at the Department of Electrical Engineering of KU Leuven, which is headed by Bart Preneel.

== Research ==
Research and expertise in digital security:

- Security architectures for information and communication systems
- Cryptographic algorithms and protocols
  - Symmetric key
  - Public key
  - Post-quantum
- Security for embedded systems
- Privacy-preserving systems

Applications:

- Cloud
- Automotive
- Privacy
- Data Protection
- Trusted Systems
- E-payments
- E-documents
- ...

=== AES ===
One of the well-known successes is the selection of Rijndael as the Advanced Encryption Standard (AES), which has millions of users. There are over a thousand applications, such as the protection of US government information.

== Research projects ==
COSIC has participated in over 50 European research projects.
