= Fred Piper =

Cryptographer

Fred C. Piper (1940–2024) was a Professor of Information Security and Honorary Fellow at Royal Holloway, University of London and is known for being the founder of the Information Security Group.

Piper studied Mathematics at the University of London (Imperial College) in 1962 and received his PhD in the same subject in 1964. He began his academic career as an Assistant Lecturer in Mathematics at Royal Holloway, University of London. He transferred to Westfield College (University of London) in 1969 and became a professor at Royal Holloway in 1975. Piper was the Founding Director of the Information Security Group at Royal Holloway that was awarded the Queen's Anniversary Prize for Higher and Further Education in 1998. During his time as a professor at the Information Security Group he supervised over 80 PhD students, including Kenny Paterson.

In addition to being a professor at Royal Holloway he held a number of visiting positions at other universities, including the University of Illinois, State University of New York, University of Florence and Peking University.

Piper was the first person in Europe that was awarded an honorary CISSP, and was also awarded an honorary CISM.
