= Joan Feigenbaum =

American computer scientist

- Born: 1958 (age 67–68); Brooklyn, New York, US
- Education: Harvard University (AB, 1981); Stanford University (PhD, 1986)
- Occupation: American computer scientist
- Partner: Jeffrey Nussbaum
- Children: 1
- Website: https://www.cs.yale.edu/homes/jf/

Joan Feigenbaum (born 1958 in Brooklyn, New York) is a computer scientist with a background in mathematics. She is the Grace Murray Hopper Professor of Computer Science at Yale University and an Amazon Scholar in the AWS Cryptography group. At Yale, she also holds a secondary appointment in the Department of Economics. She has worked in several research areas over the course of her career, including cryptography, security, and privacy; computational complexity; algorithmic mechanism design; massive-data-stream algorithmics; and, most recently, computer science and law.

== Education and career ==
Feigenbaum did her undergraduate work in Mathematics at Harvard University. She became interested in computers during the Summer Research Program at Bell Labs between her junior and senior years. She then earned a Ph.D. in computer science at Stanford University, under the supervision of Andrew Yao, while working summers at Bell Labs. Upon finishing her PhD in 1986, she joined AT&T Bell Labs. She moved to Yale in 2000, became the Hopper Professor at Yale in 2008, and became an Amazon Scholar in 2018.

== Family ==
She is married to Jeffrey Nussbaum. They have a son, Sam Baum. Baum was chosen as the child's surname, because it is the greatest common suffix of Feigenbaum and Nussbaum.

== Awards and honors ==
In 1998, Feigenbaum was an Invited Speaker at the International Congress of Mathematicians in Berlin and, in 1999, she was a Plenary Speaker at the American Mathematical Society Winter Meeting in San Antonio.

In 2001, she was named a fellow of the Association for Computing Machinery for her "foundational and highly influential contributions to cryptographic complexity theory, authorization and trust management, massive-data-stream computation, and algorithmic mechanism design." In 2012, she was named a fellow of the American Association for the Advancement of Science and chosen by the Connecticut Technology Council as a Woman of Innovation. In 2013, she was elected as a member of the Connecticut Academy of Science and Engineering. In 2024, she was named a fellow of the Institute of Electrical and Electronics Engineers and a fellow of the International Association for Cryptologic Research. In May 2020, she won the Test-of-Time Award from the IEEE Symposium on Security and Privacy for her 1996 paper (with Matt Blaze and Jack Lacy) entitled "Decentralized Trust Management."

Professor Feigenbaum has served the computing community in many roles over the course of her career. Currently, she serves as an Editorial-Board Member for the Communications of the ACM and a Steering-Committee Member for the ACM Symposium on Computer Science and Law.
