= Hideki Imai =

Japanese information theorist and cryptographer

- Occupations: Information theorist, cryptographer

Hideki Imai (今井 秀樹, Imai Hideki; born May 31, 1943, in Shimane Prefecture, Japan) is a Japanese information theorist and cryptographer. His research has included information theory, coding theory, cryptography, and information security.

In 1977, together with S. Hirakawa, he proposed a coded multilevel signal modulation scheme using several classes of binary error-correcting codes, whose symbols are combined to set up the transmission signal. This scheme is known as the Imai–Hirakawa code.

Imai received B.E., M.E., and Ph.D. degrees in electrical engineering from the University of Tokyo in 1966, 1968, and 1971, respectively. From 1971 to 1992 he was on the faculty of Yokohama National University, and from 1992 to 2006 he was a professor at the Institute of Industrial Science, University of Tokyo. In 2006 he was appointed emeritus professor of the University of Tokyo and professor at Chuo University. He also served as director of the Research Center for Information Security at the National Institute of Advanced Industrial Science and Technology.

He became an IEEE Fellow in 1992 for contributions to the theory of coded modulation and two-dimensional codes, and an IACR Fellow in 2007.
