= Anna Lysyanskaya =

American cryptographer

- Анна Лисянська
- Born: Kiev, Ukrainian SSR, Soviet Union (now Kyiv, Ukraine)
- Occupation: Cryptographer

Anna A. Lysyanskaya (Note: Ukrainian: Анна А. Лисянська, romanized: Anna A. Lysianska) is a cryptographer known for her research on digital signatures and anonymous digital credentials. She is the James A. and Julie N. Brown Professor of Computer Science at Brown University.

== Early life and education ==
Lysyanskaya grew up in Kiev, Ukrainian SSR, Soviet Union (now Kyiv, Ukraine), and came to the US in 1993 to attend Smith College, where she graduated in 1997. She went to the Massachusetts Institute of Technology for graduate study, earning a master's degree in 1999 and completing her Ph.D. in 2002. Her dissertation, Signature Schemes and Applications to Cryptographic Protocol Design, was supervised by Ron Rivest.

== Career ==
After completing her doctorate, Lysyanskaya joined the Brown University faculty in 2002. She was given the James A. and Julie N. Brown Professorship in 2023.

She is a member of the board of directors of the International Association for Cryptologic Research (IACR), first elected in 2012, and re-elected for three additional three-year terms in 2015, 2018 and 2021. She was named IACR Fellow in 2025. She served on the Scientific Advisory Board for the Institute for Computational and Experimental Research in Mathematics (ICERM) through 2021.

She was awarded the Levchin Prize in 2024 “for the development of efficient Anonymous Credentials”.

== See also ==
- Signatures with efficient protocols
