= Rafael Pass =

Computer scientist

Rafael Pass is a Swedish-American computer scientist working in cryptography, computational complexity, and game theory. He is a professor at Cornell University and Tel Aviv University. Together with his student Yanyi Liu, Pass solved a 50 year old problem in cryptography, the connection between one-way functions and the time-bounded Kolmogorov complexity problem.

Pass earned a PhD in Computer Science at Massachusetts Institute of Technology in 2006. He was appointed a IACR Fellow in 2023 and a ACM Fellow in 2022.
