= Information Security Group =

Academic information security group

The Information Security Group (ISG) is one of the oldest academic departments focusing on Information Security and Cyber Security. It is part of the Engineering, Physical Sciences and Mathematics School (EPMS) at Royal Holloway, University of London. It has around 25 established academic posts, 7 visiting Professors or Fellows and over 90 research students. The Founder Director of the ISG was the late Professor Fred Piper, and the current director is Professor Lizzie Coles-Kemp. Previous directors include Professors Peter Komisarczuk, Keith Martin, Keith Mayes, Chris Mitchell and Peter Wild.

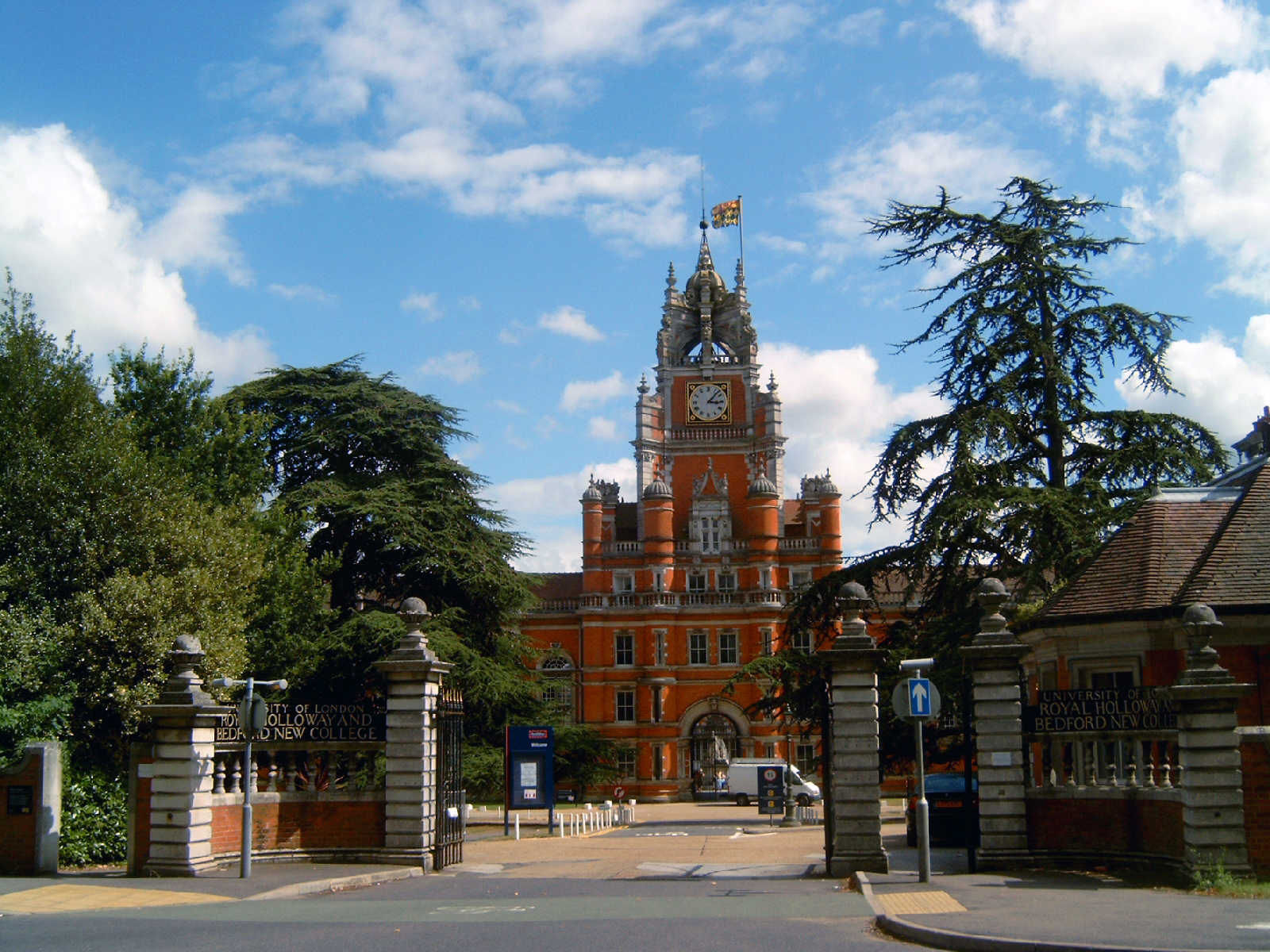
Royal Holloway's Founder's Building, where the ISG Smart Card and IoT Security Centre (SCC) was located.

== History and composition ==
The ISG was founded in 1990. In 1992, the ISG introduced an MSc in information security, being the first university in the world to offer a postgraduate course in the subject. In 2014 this course received full certification from GCHQ. In 2017 it won the award for the Best Cyber Security Education Programme at SC Awards Europe 2017 and in 2021 it was awarded gold status by the National Cyber Security Centre (NCSC).

In the ISG was awarded a Queen's Anniversary Prize in recognition of its work in the field of information security. It has also been awarded the status of Academic Centre of Excellence in Cyber Security Research (ACE-CSR) and hosts a Centre for Doctoral Training in cyber security.

Research topics addressed by the ISG include: the design and evaluation of cryptographic algorithms, protocols and key management; provable security; smart cards; RFID; electronic commerce; security management; mobile telecommunications security; authentication and identity management; cyber-physical systems; embedded security; Internet of Things (IoT); and human related aspects of cyber security. The current director of Research is Professor Stephen Wolthusen.

The ISG includes the Smart Card and IoT Security Centre (previously named Smart Card Centre, SCC) that was founded in October 2002 by Royal Holloway, Vodafone and Giesecke & Devrient, for training and research in the field of Smart cards, applications and related technologies: its research topics include RFID, Near Field Communication (NFC), mobile devices, IoT, and general embedded/implementation system security. In 2008, the SCC was commissioned to perform a counter expertise review of the OV-chipkaart by the Dutch Ministry of Transport, Public Works and Water Management. The SCC has received support from a number of industrial partners, such as Orange Labs (UK), the UK Cards Association, Transport for London and ITSO. The current director of the Smart Card and IoT Security Centre is Dr. Konstantinos Markantonakis.

The ISG also includes a Systems Security Research Lab (S2Lab), which was created in 2014, to investigate how to protect systems from software related threats, such as malware and botnets. The research in the lab covers many different Computer Science-related topics, such as operating systems, computer architecture, program analysis, and machine learning.

Current and former associated academics include Whitfield Diffie, Kenny Paterson, David Naccache, Matt Robshaw, Michael Walker, Sean Murphy and Igor Muttik.

Royal Holloway's Information Security Group has been mentioned in popular media, most notably in the New York Times bestseller The Da Vinci Code by Dan Brown.
