= International Association for Cryptologic Research =

Scientific organization for research in cryptology

- Formation: 1982
- Founder: David Chaum
- Members: 2523 (in 2025)
- President: Allison Bishop
- Main organ: Journal of Cryptology, IACR conferences and workshops, Cryptology ePrint Archive
- Website: iacr.org

The International Association for Cryptologic Research (IACR) is a non-profit scientific organization that furthers research in cryptology and related fields. The IACR was organized at the initiative of David Chaum at the CRYPTO '82 conference.

== Activities ==
The IACR organizes and sponsors three annual flagship conferences, four area conferences in specific sub-areas of cryptography, and one symposium:

- Crypto (flagship)
- Eurocrypt (flagship)
- Asiacrypt (flagship)
- Fast Software Encryption (FSE)
- Public Key Cryptography (PKC)
- Cryptographic Hardware and Embedded Systems (CHES)
- Theory of Cryptography (TCC)
- Real World Crypto Symposium (RWC)

Several other conferences and workshops are held in cooperation with the IACR. Starting in 2015, selected summer schools will be officially sponsored by the IACR. CRYPTO '83 was the first conference officially sponsored by the IACR.

The IACR publishes the Journal of Cryptology, and Communications in Cryptology, in addition to the proceedings of its conference and workshops. The IACR also maintains the Cryptology ePrint Archive, an online repository of cryptologic research papers aimed at providing rapid dissemination of results.

=== Crypto ===
The International Cryptology Conference (or CRYPTO) is an academic conference on all aspects of cryptography and cryptanalysis. It is held yearly in August in Santa Barbara, California at the University of California, Santa Barbara.

The first CRYPTO was held in 1981. It was the first major conference on cryptology and was all the more important because relations between government, industry and academia were rather tense. Encryption was considered a very sensitive subject and the coming together of delegates from different countries was unheard-of at the time. The initiative for the formation of the IACR came during CRYPTO '82, and CRYPTO '83 was the first IACR sponsored conference.

=== Eurocrypt ===
Eurocrypt (or EUROCRYPT) is a conference for cryptography research. The full name of the conference is now the Annual International Conference on the Theory and Applications of Cryptographic Techniques. Eurocrypt is one of the IACR flagship conferences, along with CRYPTO and ASIACRYPT.

Eurocrypt is held annually in the spring in various locations throughout Europe. The first workshop in the series of conferences that became known as Eurocrypt was held in 1982. In 1984, the name "Eurocrypt" was first used. Generally, there have been published proceedings including all papers at the conference every year, with two exceptions; in 1983, no proceedings was produced, and in 1986, the proceedings contained only abstracts. Springer has published all the official proceedings, first as part of Advances in Cryptology in the Lecture Notes in Computer Science series.

=== Asiacrypt ===
Asiacrypt (also ASIACRYPT) is an international conference for cryptography research. The full name of the conference is currently International Conference on the Theory and Application of Cryptology and Information Security, though this has varied over time. Asiacrypt is a conference sponsored by the IACR since 2000, and is one of its three flagship conferences. Asiacrypt is now held annually in November or December at various locations throughout Asia and Australia.

Initially, the Asiacrypt conferences were called AUSCRYPT, as the first one was held in Sydney, Australia in 1990, and only later did the community decide that the conference should be held in locations throughout Asia. The first conference to be called "Asiacrypt" was held in 1991 in Fujiyoshida, Japan.

=== Cryptographic Hardware and Embedded Systems ===
Cryptographic Hardware and Embedded Systems (CHES) is a conference for cryptography research, focusing on the implementation of cryptographic algorithms. The two general areas treated are the efficient and the secure implementation of algorithms. Related topics such as random number generators, physical unclonable function or special-purpose cryptanalytical machines are also commonly covered at the workshop. It was first held in Worcester, Massachusetts in 1999 at Worcester Polytechnic Institute (WPI). It was founded by Çetin Kaya Koç and Christof Paar. CHES 2000 was also held at WPI; after that, the conference has been held at various locations worldwide. After the two CHES' at WPI, the locations in the first ten years were, in chronological order, Paris, San Francisco, Cologne, Boston, Edinburgh, Yokohama, Vienna, Washington, D.C., and Lausanne. Since 2009, CHES rotates between the three continents Europe, North America and Asia. The attendance record was set by CHES 2018 in Amsterdam with about 600 participants.

=== Fast Software Encryption ===
Fast Software Encryption, often abbreviated FSE, is a workshop for cryptography research, focused on symmetric-key cryptography with an emphasis on fast, practical techniques, as opposed to theory. Though "encryption" is part of the conference title, it is not limited to encryption research; research on other symmetric techniques such as message authentication codes and hash functions is often presented there. FSE has been an IACR workshop since 2002, though the first FSE workshop was held in 1993. FSE is held annually in various locations worldwide, mostly in Europe. The dates of the workshop have varied over the years, but recently, it has been held in February.

=== Public Key Cryptography ===
PKC or Public-Key Cryptography is the short name of the International Workshop on Theory and Practice in Public Key Cryptography (modified as International Conference on Theory and Practice in Public Key Cryptography since 2006).

=== Theory of Cryptography ===
The Theory of Cryptography Conference, often abbreviated TCC, is an annual conference for theoretical cryptography research. It was first held in 2004 at MIT, and was also held at MIT in 2005, both times in February. TCC became an IACR-sponsored workshop in 2006. The founding steering committee consists of Mihir Bellare, Ivan Damgård, Oded Goldreich, Shafi Goldwasser, Johan Håstad, Russell Impagliazzo, Ueli Maurer, Silvio Micali, Moni Naor, and Tatsuaki Okamoto.

The importance of the theoretical study of Cryptography is widely recognized by now. This area has contributed much to the practice of cryptography and secure systems as well as to the theory of computation at large.

The needs of the theoretical cryptography (TC) community are best understood in relation to the two communities between which it resides: the Theory of Computation (TOC) community and the Cryptography/Security community. All three communities have grown in volume in recent years. This increase in volume makes the hosting of TC by the existing TOC and Crypto conferences quite problematic. Furthermore, the perspectives of TOC and Crypto on TC do not necessarily fit the internal perspective of TC and the interests of TC. All these indicate a value in the establishment of an independent specialized conference. A dedicated conference not only provides opportunities for research dissemination and interaction, but helps shape the field, give it a recognizable identity, and communicate its message.

=== Real World Crypto Symposium ===
The Real World Crypto Symposium is a conference for applied cryptography research, which was started in 2012 by Kenny Paterson and Nigel Smart. The winner of the Levchin Prize is announced at RWC. Announcements made at the symposium include the first known chosen prefix attack on SHA-1 and the inclusion of end-to-end encryption in Facebook Messenger. Also, the introduction of the E4 chip took place at RWC. Flaws in messaging apps such as WhatsApp were also presented there.

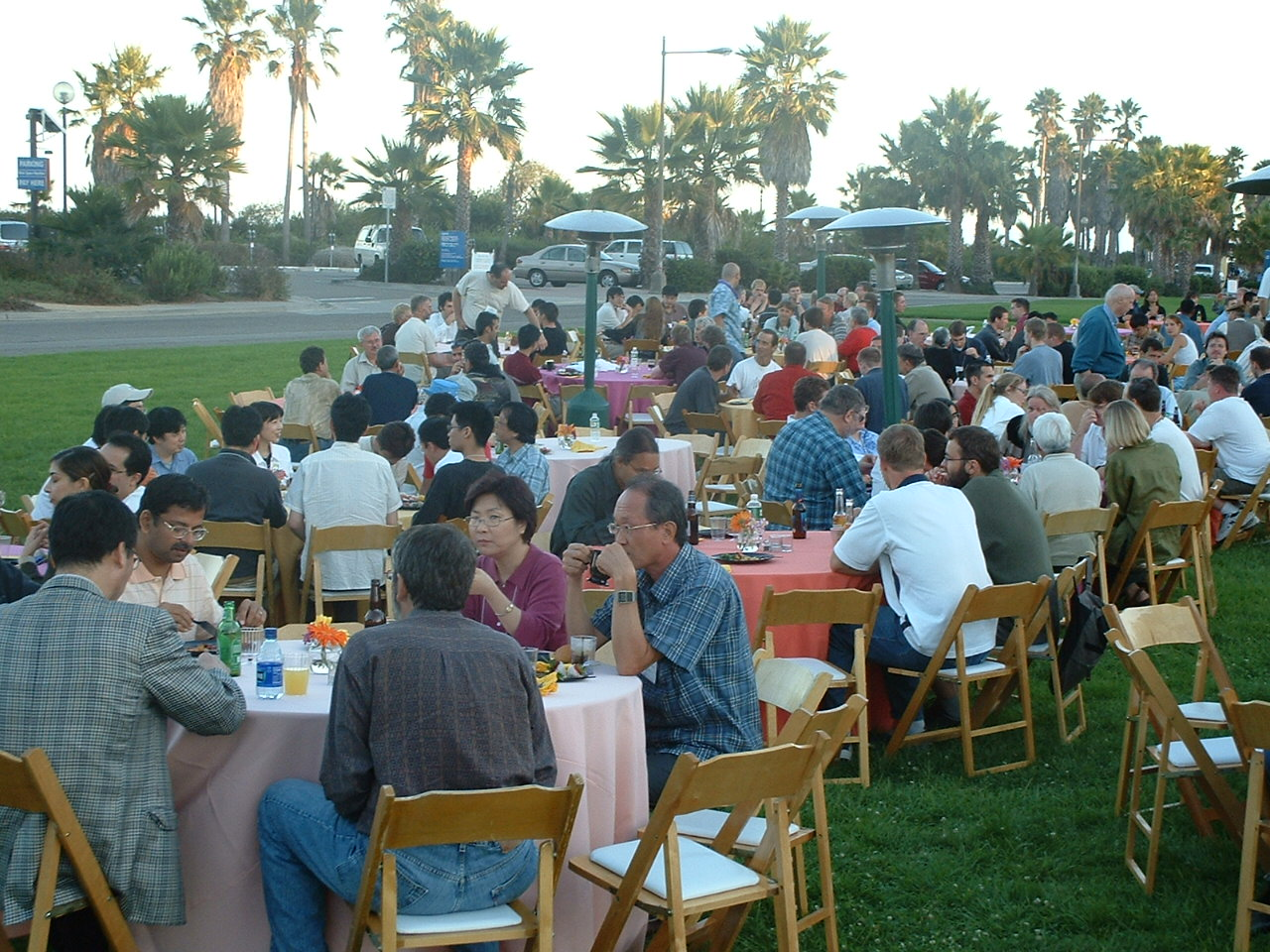
CRYPTO 2003 conference reception.

== Fellows ==
The IACR Fellows Program (FIACR) has been established as an honor to bestow upon its exceptional members. There are currently 119 IACR Fellows.

- Adi Shamir (2004)
- Ron Rivest (2004)
- Whitfield Diffie (2004)
- Don Coppersmith (2004)
- David Chaum (2004)
- Tom Berson (2004)
- Jacques Stern (2005)
- Gustavus Simmons (2005)
- Kevin McCurley (2005)
- Martin Hellman (2006)
- Gilles Brassard (2006)
- Silvio Micali (2007)
- Hideki Imai (2007)
- Shafi Goldwasser (2007)
- Moni Naor (2008)
- Ralph Merkle (2008)
- Ueli Maurer (2008)
- Michael O. Rabin (2009)
- James Massey (2009)
- Arjen Lenstra (2009)
- Oded Goldreich (2009)
- George Blakley (2009)
- Andrew Yao (2010)
- Jean-Jacques Quisquater (2010)
- Yvo G. Desmedt (2010)
- Ivan Damgård (2010)
- Andrew Clark (2010)
- Scott Vanstone (2011)
- Richard Schroeppel (2011)
- Charles Rackoff (2011)
- David Kahn (2011)
- Jennifer Seberry (2012)
- Claus P. Schnorr (2012)
- Phillip Rogaway (2012)
- Andrew Odlyzko (2012)
- Manuel Blum (2012)
- Eli Biham (2012)
- Mihir Bellare (2012)
- Rafail Ostrovsky (2013)
- Victor S. Miller (2013)
- Hugo Krawczyk (2013)
- Lars Ramkilde Knudsen (2013)
- Claude Crépeau (2013)
- Ronald Cramer (2013)
- Dan Boneh (2013)
- Moti Yung (2014)
- Eyal Kushilevitz (2014)
- Antoine Joux (2014)
- Ran Canetti(2014)
- Tal Rabin (2015)
- Bart Preneel (2015)
- Tatsuaki Okamoto (2015)
- Kaisa Nyberg (2015)
- Joe Kilian (2015)
- Ernie Brickell (2015)
- Nigel Smart (2016)
- Victor Shoup (2016)
- Shai Halevi (2016)
- Ed Dawson (2016)
- Kenny Paterson (2017)
- Christof Paar (2017)
- Kwangjo Kim (2017)
- Louis Guillou (2017)
- Jan Camenisch (2017)
- Stafford Tavares (2018)
- Paul Kocher (2018)
- Yuval Ishai (2018)
- Juan Garay (2018)
- Jonathan Katz (2019)
- Kaoru Kurosawa (2019)
- Daniele Micciancio (2019)
- Vincent Rijmen (2019)
- Amit Sahai (2019)
- Xiaoyun Wang (2019)
- David Naccache (2020)
- Yevgeniy Dodis (2020)
- Rosario Gennaro (2020)
- Xuejia Lai (2020)
- Tal Malkin (2020)
- Craig Gentry (2021)
- Yehuda Lindell (2021)
- Josef Pieprzyk (2021)
- Leonid Reyzin (2021)
- Ingrid Verbauwhede (2021)
- Masayuki Abe (2022)
- Christian Cachin (2022)
- Claude Carlet (2022)
- Benny Pinkas (2022)
- Yael Tauman Kalai (2022)
- Jung Hee Cheon (2023)
- Stanisław Jarecki (2023)
- Marc Joye (2023)
- Jesper Buus Nielsen (2023)
- Rafael Pass (2023)
- Giuseppe Persiano (2023)
- Reihaneh Safavi-Naini (2023)
- Anne Canteaut (2024)
- Joan Feigenbaum (2024)
- Alfred Menezes (2024)
- Kobbi Nissim (2024)
- Chris Peikert (2024)
- David Pointcheval (2024)
- François-Xavier Standaert (2024)
- Brent Waters (2024)
- Joan Daemen (2025)
- Thomas Johansson (2025)
- Anna Lysyanskaya (2025)
- Pascal Paillier (2025)
- J.R. RAO (2025)
- Alon Rosen (2025)
- Elaine Shi (2025)
- Bo-Yin Yang (2025)
- Aggelos Kiayias (2026)
- Brian LaMacchia (2026)
- Gregor Leander (2026)
- Willi Meier (2026)
- Vinod Vaikuntanathan (2026)
- Huaxiong Wang (2026)
- Hoeteck Wee (2026)
