= KN-Cipher =

Block cipher

General
- Designers: Kaisa Nyberg and Lars Knudsen
- First published: 1995

Cipher detail
- Key sizes: 198 bits
- Block sizes: 64 bits
- Structure: Feistel network
- Rounds: 6

Best public cryptanalysis
- Jakobsen & Knudsen's higher order differential cryptanalysis breaks KN-Cipher with only 512 chosen plaintexts and 2^{41} running time, or with 32 chosen plaintexts and 2^{70} running time.

In cryptography, KN-Cipher is a block cipher created by Kaisa Nyberg and Lars Knudsen in 1995. One of the first ciphers designed to be provably secure against ordinary differential cryptanalysis, KN-Cipher was later broken using higher order differential cryptanalysis.

Presented as "a prototype...compatible with DES", the algorithm has a 64-bit block size and a 6-round Feistel network structure. The round function is based on the cube operation in the finite field GF(2^{33}).

The designers did not specify any key schedule for the cipher; they state, "All round keys should be independent, therefore we need at least 198 key bits."

== Cryptanalysis ==
Jakobsen & Knudsen's higher order differential cryptanalysis breaks KN-Cipher with only 512 chosen plaintexts and 2^{41} running time, or with 32 chosen plaintexts and 2^{70} running time.
