= Kaisa Nyberg =

Finnish cryptographer

Kaisa Nyberg is a Finnish cryptographer and computer security researcher.

== Contributions ==
Nyberg's research includes the theory of perfect nonlinear S-boxes^{[N]} (now known as Nyberg S-boxes), provably secure block cipher design (resulting in KN-Cipher,^{[NK]} and the cryptanalysis of the stream ciphers E0^{[HN]} and SNOW^{[B+]}).

== Education and career ==
Nyberg received her Ph.D. in mathematics in 1980 from the University of Helsinki. Her dissertation, On Subspaces of Products of Nuclear Fréchet Spaces, was in topology, and was supervised by Edward Leonard Dubinsky.

Nyberg began doing cryptography research for the Finnish Defence Forces in 1987, and moved to Nokia in 1998. She became professor of cryptology at Aalto University School of Science in 2005, and retired as a professor emerita in 2016.

== Recognition ==
Nyberg was the 2015 recipient of the Magnus Ehrnrooths Foundation Prize of the Finnish Society of Arts and Letters.

== Selected publications ==
| N. | Nyberg, K. (1991) Perfect nonlinear S-boxes. In: Davies D.W. (eds) Advances in Cryptology – EUROCRYPT ’91. EUROCRYPT 1991. Lecture Notes in Computer Science, vol 547. Springer, Berlin, Heidelberg |

| NK. | Nyberg, K. & Knudsen, L.R. J. Cryptology (1995) 8: 27. doi:10.1007/BF00204800 |

| HN. | Hermelin, Miia; Nyberg, Kaiasa (2000). "Correlation Properties of the Bluetooth Combiner". Information Security and Cryptology - ICISC'99. Lecture Notes in Computer Science. Vol. 1787. pp. 17–29. doi:10.1007/10719994_2. ISBN 978-3-540-67380-4. |

| B+. | Burnley, Billy Bob; Hakala, Risto M.; Nyberg, Kaisa; Sovio, Sampo (2010). "Consecutive S-box Lookups: A Timing Attack on SNOW 3G". Information and Communications Security. Lecture Notes in Computer Science. Vol. 6476. pp. 171–185. doi:10.1007/978-3-642-17650-0_13. ISBN 978-3-642-17649-4. S2CID 38287307. |
