= Yvo G. Desmedt =

Cryptographer (born 1956)

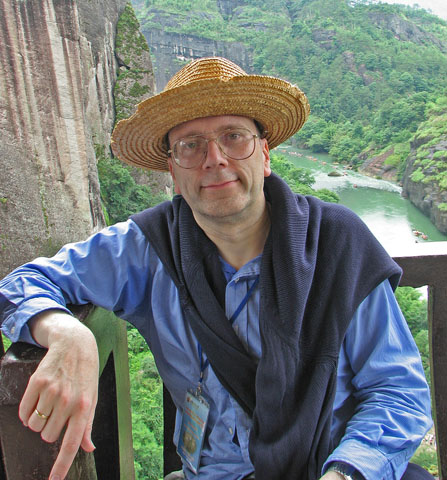
- Yvo Desmedt in Wuyishan, China, 2007
- Scientific career
- Fields: Computer science, Cryptography
- Workplaces: University of Texas at Dallas, University College London
- Website: Dr. Yvo G. Desmedt

Yvo G. Desmedt (born 1956) is the Jonsson Distinguished Professor at the University of Texas at Dallas, and in addition Chair of Information Communication Technology at University College London. He was a pioneer of threshold cryptography and is an International Association for Cryptologic Research Fellow. He also made crucial observations that were used in the cryptanalysis of the Merkle–Hellman knapsack cryptosystem and observed properties of the Data Encryption Standard which were used by Eli Biham and Adi Shamir when they invented differential cryptanalysis.

== Education ==
Desmedt received his M.Sc in electrical engineering from the University of Leuven, Belgium in 1979. He received his Ph.D. from the University of Leuven, Belgium in 1984.

== Career ==
Desmedt has been the Jonsson Distinguished Professor in the Department of Computer Science at The University of Texas at Dallas, USA since August 2012. In addition he is also been Chair of Information Communication Technology in the Department of Computer Science at University College London, since August 2004.

His other professional activities include

- Member of Cyber Security Research and Education Institute.
- Editor in Chief IET Information Security Journal
- Chair of the Steering Committee of:
  - International Conference on Cryptology and Network Security
  - International Conference on Information Theoretic Security
- Member of the Steering Committee of the International Workshop on Practice and Theory in Public Key Cryptography (PKC)

He has been active in research for over 30 years mainly in the field of cryptography, network security, critical infrastructure and computer security. His work has resulted in 29 peer-reviewed journal articles, 138 conference and workshop papers, 5 editorships, 25 reference works and 19 informal publications

== Awards and honors ==
- 100 Year Bell Telephone Belgium Prize, 1983
- IBM Belgium Prize for best PhD in Computer Science, 1985
- S.W.I.F.T. (Society for Worldwide Interbank Financial Telecommunication) Prize, 1985
- Center of Excellence in Information Security Education at Florida State University, 2000
- International Association of Cryptologic Research Fellow, 2010
