= Christian Cachin =

Swiss cryptographer and computer scientist

Christian Cachin is a Swiss cryptographer and professor of computer science at the University of Bern, Switzerland.

In 2000 he founded the Cryptology ePrint Archive, an eprint repository for research in cryptology.

He was elected as president of the International Association for Cryptologic Research for 2014-2016 and for 2017-2019. In 2015 he was named Fellow of the Institute of Electrical and Electronics Engineers (IEEE) for "contributions to steganography and secure distributed systems". He was elected as an ACM Fellow in 2019 "for contributions to secure distributed computing and cryptographic protocols". In 2022 he was also named a Fellow of the International Association for Cryptologic Research for "far-reaching contributions in the fields of cryptography and distributed systems, and for outstanding service to the IACR".
