= Jan Camenisch =

Swiss research scientist

- Education: ETH Zurich
- Occupations: Cryptographer, Computer Scientist, CTO
- Employer: Category Labs
- Known for: Identity Mixer; Direct Anonymous Attestation (DAA)
- Awards: IACR Fellow; IEEE Fellow; ACM Fellow; ACM SIGSAC outstanding innovation award; IEEE computer society technical achievement award; IFIP Kristian Beckman award; Levchin Prize for Real-World Cryptography

Jan Leonhard Camenisch is a Swiss research scientist in cryptography and privacy at Category Labs, and is the former CTO of DFINITY. He previously worked at IBM Research – Zurich, Switzerland and has published over 140 widely cited scientific articles and holds more than 100 U.S. patents.

Camenisch received an engineer's degree in electrical engineering in 1993 and a Ph.D. in computer science in 1998, both from ETH Zurich. He was an assistant professor in computer science at the University of Aarhus, Denmark, before joining the IBM Zurich Research Laboratory in 1999. Camenisch was born in the small Swiss village of Langwies.

== Awards ==
Camenisch was named Fellow of the Institute of Electrical and Electronics Engineers (IEEE) for contributions to privacy-enhancing cryptographic protocols in 2013 and Fellow of the International Association for Cryptologic Research for contributions to the theory and practice of privacy-preserving protocols and impact on government policy and industry in 2017.

He received the 2010 ACM SIGSAC Outstanding Innovation Award for outstanding theoretical work on privacy-enhancing cryptographic protocols and his leadership in their practical realization and a Technical Achievement Award from the IEEE Computer Society for pioneering theoretical work on privacy-enhancing cryptographic protocols and leadership in their practical realization in 2013.

He was elected as an ACM Fellow in 2018 for "contributions to privacy-enhancing cryptographic protocols and leadership in their practical realization".

In 2024, Jan received the Levchin Prize for Real-World Cryptography together with Anna Lysyanskaya for "the development of efficient Anonymous Credentials".
