= Cryptology ePrint Archive =

Electronic archive of cryptography research

The Cryptology ePrint Archive is an electronic archive (eprint) of new results in the field of cryptography, maintained by the International Association for Cryptologic Research. It contains articles covering many of the most recent advances in cryptography, that did not necessarily undergo any refereeing process.

== See also ==
- arXiv
- Electronic Colloquium on Computational Complexity
