= Vincent Rijmen =

Belgian cryptographer (born 1970)

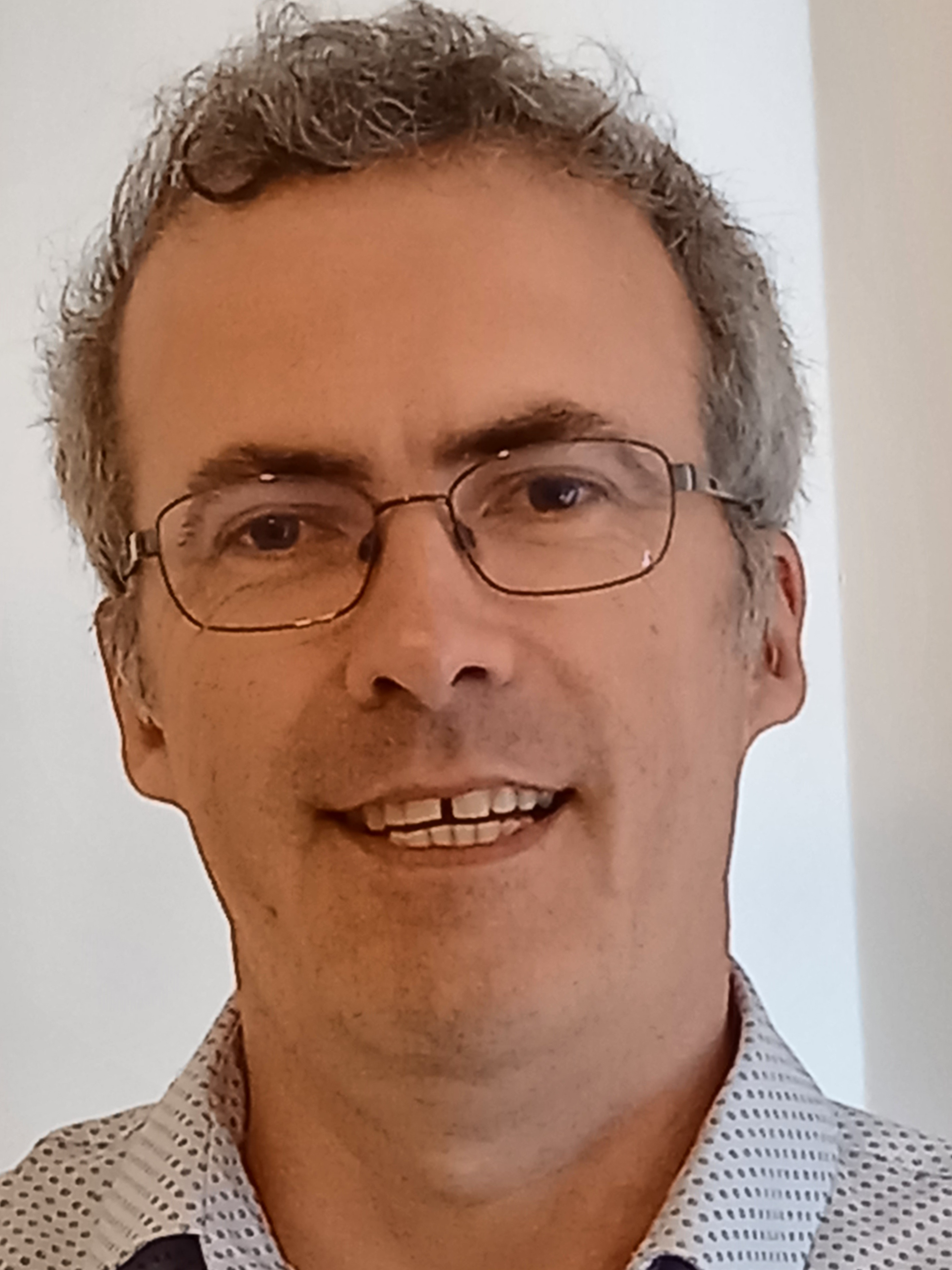
- Vincent Rijmen in 2021
- Born: 16 October 1970 (age 55); Leuven, Belgium
- Education: KU Leuven
- Known for: Rijndael
- Awards: Levchin Prize
- Scientific career
- Fields: Cryptography
- Workplaces: KU Leuven
- Thesis: Cryptanalysis and Design of Iterated Block Ciphers (1997)
- Doctoral advisor: Joos Vandewalle; René Govaerts

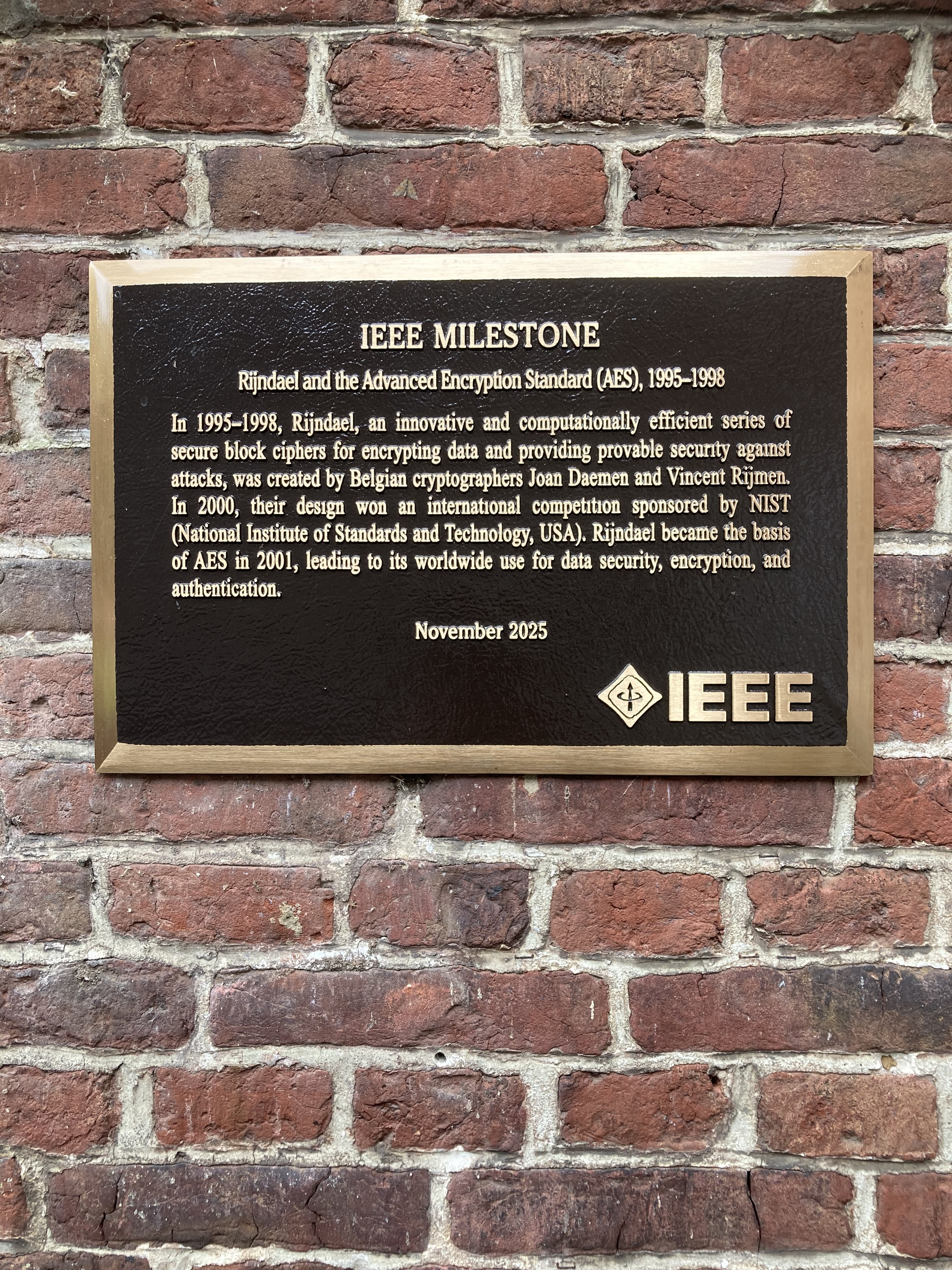
The IEEE Milestone for AES.

Vincent Rijmen (Dutch pronunciation: [ˈvɪnsɛnt ˈrɛimə(n)]; born 16 October 1970) is a Belgian cryptographer and one of the two designers of the Rijndael, the Advanced Encryption Standard. Rijmen is also the co-designer of the WHIRLPOOL cryptographic hash function, and the block ciphers Anubis, KHAZAD, Square, NOEKEON and SHARK.

In 1993, Rijmen obtained a degree in electronics engineering at the Katholieke Universiteit Leuven. Afterwards, he was a PhD student at the ESAT/COSIC lab of the K.U.Leuven. In 1997, Rijmen finished his doctoral dissertation titled Cryptanalysis and design of iterated block ciphers.

After his PhD he did postdoctoral work at the COSIC lab, on several occasions collaborating with Joan Daemen. One of their joint projects resulted in the algorithm Rijndael, which in October 2000 was selected by the National Institute for Standards and Technology (NIST) to become the Advanced Encryption Standard (AES). In November 2025, the Institute of Electrical and Electronics Engineers (IEEE) awarded the work on the Advanced Encryption Standard with an IEEE Milestone, placed in the Arenberg Castle, Leuven, Belgium.

Since 1 August 2001, Rijmen has been working as chief cryptographer at Cryptomathic where he cooperated with cryptographers such as Peter Landrock. From 2001 to 2003, Rijmen was a visiting professor at the Institute for Applied Information Processing and Communications at Graz University of Technology (Austria), and a full professor there from 2004 to 2007. Since October 2007, Rijmen has worked again with the COSIC lab and currently holds a professor position (gewoon hoogleraar) at K.U.Leuven. Since January 2019 he is also an adjunct professor at Selmer Center (the secure communication group at the University of Bergen, Norway).

In 2002, he was named by the MIT Technology Review TR100 as one of the top 100 innovators in the world under the age of 35.

In 2019, he was named a Fellow of the International Association for Cryptologic Research for "co-designing AES, contributions to the design and cryptanalysis of symmetric primitives, and service to the IACR."

In 2020, he received, with Joan Daemen, the RSA Award for Excellence in Mathematics from the hands of Ron Rivest.

In 2023, he received the Levchin Prize for his work on AES.

For 2025 he was awarded the BBVA Foundation Frontiers of Knowledge Award in the category "Information and Communication Technologies" jointly with Joan Daemen.
