= Journal of Cryptology =

Academic journal

- Discipline: Cryptography
- Language: English
- Edited by: Vincent Rijmen

Publication details
- History: 1988–present
- Publisher: Springer Nature (Germany)
- Open access: Hybrid
- Impact factor: 1.221 (2020)

Standard abbreviations
- ISO 4: J. Cryptol.
- MathSciNet: J. Cryptology

Indexing
- ISSN: 0933-2790 (print); 1432-1378 (web)

Links
- Journal homepage; Online access

The Journal of Cryptology (ISSN 0933-2790) is a scientific journal in the field of cryptology and cryptography. The journal is published quarterly by the International Association for Cryptologic Research. Its editor-in-chief is Vincent Rijmen.
