= List of Clark Atlanta University people =

== Notable alumni ==
This is a list of notable alumni which includes graduates, non-graduate former students, and current students of Atlanta University, Clark College, Clark University, and/or Clark Atlanta University. It does not include other notable people who may have attended Clark Atlanta University as cross-registered students (credit as an alumnus is not given to Clark Atlanta University, which has spurred controversy over the school's cross-registration policies).

Name	Class year	Notability	Reference(s)
Ralph Abernathy	1951	Civil rights activist	
Marvin S. Arrington, Sr.	1963	Politician and first black graduate of Emory University School of Law	
Carolyn Long Banks	1962	First black woman to sit on the Atlanta City Council	
Ajamu Baraka		Human rights activist and 2016 Green Party vice presidential nominee	
Brenda S. Banks	1982	Archivist	
Bryan Barber	1996	Film director	
Kenya Barris	1996	Television producer	
Hamilton Bohannon		Songwriter and record producer	
Joseph Bouie Jr.		Politician and university administrator	
Winifred Burks-Houck		Environmental organic chemist and the first female president of National Organization for the Professional Advancement of Black Chemists and Chemical Engineers	
Ruby Chappelle Boyd	1943	Librarian	
James Albert Bray	1893	C.M.E. bishop, educator, academic administrator	
Melanie L. Campbell	1983	Voting rights activist	
Wayman Carver		Composer	
Theresa Chapple		Epidemiologist	
Pearl Cleage		Author	
Pinky Cole	2009	Restaurateur	
Aki Collins	1997	Assistant coach with the Marquette Golden Eagles men's basketball team	
Marva Collins	1957	Educator	
Clarence Cooper	1964	Federal judge	
Bryan-Michael Cox		Record producer and songwriter	
N'Dea Davenport		Singer	
Amanda Davis		News anchor	
James Dean	1966, 1968	Social worker and politician	
DJ Drama	2000	Music producer	
DeWitt Sanford Dykes Sr.	1930	Methodist minister, architect of churches	
Mary Frances Early	1957	First African-American graduate of the University of Georgia	
James Felder	1961	Civil rights activist	
Henry O. Flipper		First black graduate of West Point	
Vincent Fort	1981	Georgia state senator	
C. Hartley Grattan	1923	Economist, historian	
Grace Towns Hamilton	1927	First African American woman elected to the Georgia General Assembly	
William Leo Hansberry	1921	Scholar	
James A. Hefner	1962	Economist	
Fletcher Henderson	1920	Pianist, band leader and composer	
Frenchy Jolene Hodges	1972	Educator, and author of poetry and short fiction	
Cora Catherine Calhoun Horne	1881	Black suffragist, civil rights activist, and Atlanta socialite	
Alexander Jefferson	1942	Retired US Air Force lieutenant colonel and a member of the Tuskegee Airmen	
Robert R. Jennings		University administrator	
Curtis Johnson	2008	Former NFL linebacker	
Henry C. "Hank" Johnson	1976	U.S. congressman	
James Weldon Johnson	1904	Noted author, educator, lawyer, diplomat, songwriter and civil rights activist; writer of the poem "Lift Ev'ry Voice and Sing", widely known as the "Negro National Anthem"	
Otis Johnson	1969	Mayor of Savannah, Georgia	
Bomani Jones	2001	Sportswriter, co-host of Highly Questionable	
Dewey W. Knight, Jr.	1957	Department director	
Walt Landers		Former NFL player	
Lucy Craft Laney		Educator	
Kenny Leon	1978	Film director	
Emmanuel Lewis	1997	Actor	
Martha S. Lewis		Government official in New York City and state	
Barbara Lewis King	1957	Founder of the Hillside Chapel and Truth Center; played an important role in the African American church and community	
Nnegest Likke		Movie director and screenwriter	
Evelyn G. Lowery		Civil rights activist	
Mase		Rapper	
Greg McCrary		Football player	
Mary Jackson McCrorey		Educator, mission worker	
New Jack		Professional wrestler	
Isaiah DeQuincey Newman		State field director, South Carolina NAACP, first African American elected to the South Carolina Senate after Reconstruction	
Phuthuma Nhleko		CEO of the MTN Group	
Major Owens		Librarian, U.S. congressman (New York)	
Dinah Watts Pace	1883	Educator	
Harry Pace	1903	African-American recording pioneer, founder of Black Swan Records, Insurance executive	
Duke Pearson		Pianist and composer	
Eva Pigford		Model/actress	
Rachel E. Pruden-Herndon		Judge and attorney; first African-American woman admitted to the Georgia Bar	
Jacque Reid	1995	Journalist	
Jo Ann Robinson	1948	Civil rights activist	
Lamont Robinson	2004	Illinois House 5th district State Representative	
Pernessa C. Seele		Immunologist; CEO and founder of Balm in Gilead, Inc.	
Amy Sherald	1997	Artist	
C. Lamont Smith		Sports agent; founder and president of All Pro Sports and Entertainment	
Marilyn Strickland	1992	U.S. congresswoman, Washington's 10th District; first Korean-American woman elected to Congress in its 230-year history	
Morris Stroud	1969	Former professional football player	
Bazoline Estelle Usher	1906, 1937	Educator, Georgia Woman of Achievement	
Bobby V	2004	Singer, born Bobby Wilson	
Walshy Fire		DJ, producer and member of Major Lazer	
Horace T. Ward		Judge	
Walter Francis White	1916	NAACP leader	
Hosea Williams		Civil rights activist	
Madaline A. Williams		First black woman elected to the New Jersey state legislature	
Sidney David Williams	1914	president of Elizabeth City State Teachers College	
Louis Tompkins Wright		Surgeon	
Richard R. Wright	1876	Paymaster in the U.S. Army	
Ella Gaines Yates		Librarian	

== Notable faculty and administrators ==
Name	Department	Notability	Reference
Ariel Serena Hedges Bowen		Music professor	
Enos Luther Brookes	Chemistry	Head of Science Department	
Robert D. Bullard	Sociology	Ware Professor of Sociology, Director of the Environmental Justice Resource Center	
Wayman Carver	Music	Jazz flute and saxophone player)	
Pearlie Craft Dove	Education	Educator, philanthropist, and community service activist	
W.E.B. Du Bois	Sociology	Author and civil rights activist	
Mary Frances Early	Music	First African American graduate of the University of Georgia	
Eliza Atkins Gleason	Library Science	Founding dean of the Atlanta University School of Library Service and the first African American to earn a Ph.D. in Library Science	
John Hope		First African American president of Morehouse College and Atlanta University (now Clark Atlanta University)	
Virginia Lacy Jones	Library Science	Librarian and dean of the School of Library and Information Studies	
Shelby F. Lewis	Political science		
Whitman Mayo		Drama professor	
Alfred Msezane		Physics professor	
Florence Price	Music	American classical composer, pianist, organist, and music teacher. Head of the music department of Clark University	
Ira De Augustine Reid	Sociology	Professor and chair of the Sociology Department	
Henry Ossawa Tanner		Painter	
Donda West	English	Mother of rapper Kanye West	
J. Ernest Wilkins, Jr.		Mathematician and nuclear scientist	
Whitney M. Young Jr.		Executive director of the National Urban League	
