= Frenchie =

Frenchie or Frenchy may refer to:

== Nickname ==
- Frenchy Bordagaray (1910–2000), American Major League Baseball player
- John Boulos (1921–2002), Haitian-American soccer player
- Ovila Cayer (1844–1909), American Civil War Union Army soldier from Quebec, Canada, and recipient of the Medal of Honor
- Percy Creuzot (1924–2010), founder of Frenchy's Chicken, a restaurant chain in Houston
- Frenchy D'Amour (1912–?), Canadian curler, 1948 Brier champion
- Frenchie Davis (born 1979), American Broadway performer and soul, dance/electronica, and pop singer
- Jeff Francoeur (born 1984), American Major League Baseball player
- John Fuqua (born 1946), American former National Football League player
- Frenchy Jolene Hodges (born 1940), American educator and writer
- Alphonse Lacroix (1897–1973), American ice hockey goaltender, member of the 1924 US Olympic team
- George LeClair (1886–1918), American Major League Baseball pitcher
- Réal Lemieux (1945–1975), Canadian National Hockey League player
- Fred Mader (1883–?), American labor leader and mobster
- Sam Marx (1859–1933), father of the Marx Brothers
- Angelique Morgan, a reality TV star and ex-adult film star, best known for her VH1 appearances
- Claude Raymond (born 1937), professional baseball player
- Frenchy Uhalt (1910–2004), Major League Baseball outfielder

== Stage or ring name ==
- Frenchie (rapper), American rapper Greg Hogan (born 1985)
- Frenchie, Francois Allegre of the band Raggasonic
- "Frenchie", nickname of French professional jockey Cédric Ségeon
- Frenchy (comedian), Australian comedian and YouTuber
- Frenchy Martin, ring name of Jean Gagné, French Canadian retired professional wrestler and manager

== Fictional characters ==
- Frenchy, in the 1939 Western film Destry Rides Again, portrayed by Marlene Dietrich
- Frenchy Fairmont, in the 1952 Western film Rancho Notorious, also played by Dietrich
- Frenchy, in the films Grease (1978) and Grease 2 (1982), portrayed by Didi Conn
- Frenchy Hercules, in the 1980 film Forbidden Zone played by Marie–Pascale Elfman
- Frenchy, in the early '90s TV show In Living Color, played by Keenen Ivory Wayans
- Frenchy, in the 2000 film Small Time Crooks, played by Tracey Ullman
- Frenchie (comics), a Marvel Comics character and associate of Moon Knight
- Frenchie (The Boys character), a character in The Boys graphic novel series as well as in the live action television series of the same name, played by Tomer Capone
- Frenchy the Clown, created by National Lampoon

== Other uses ==
- Frenchie (film), a 1950 American Western, starring Shelley Winters as the title character
- Frenchy (film), an unreleased action film starring Jean-Claude Van Damme
- Frenchie (dog), a nickname for the French Bulldog breed of dog

== See also ==
- French people
- Frenchy's Chicken, a restaurant chain in Texas, founded by Percy "Frenchy" Creuzot
- Frenchy's (second-hand clothing), a used clothing store retail phenomenon in Atlantic Canada
- Castle Rock, Utah, United States, a ghost town also known as "Frenchies"
- Franchy Cordero (born 1994), Dominican professional baseball outfielder
- Frenchi, a type of cane beetle
- Cheese Frenchee, a sandwich in the cuisine of the Midwestern United States
