= Phi Delta Kappa (sorority) =

African-American professional education sorority

- ΦΔΚ
- Founded: May 23, 1923; 102 years ago Jersey City, New Jersey
- Type: Professional
- Affiliation: Independent
- Status: Active
- Emphasis: African American, Education
- Scope: International
- Colors: Scarlet red and Gold
- Publication: The Krinon; The Courier
- Chapters: 146
- Members: 5,000 lifetime
- Headquarters: 8233 South King Drive; Chicago, Illinois 60619; United States
- Website: www.nspdk.org

The National Sorority of Phi Delta Kappa, Inc. (NSPDK) is an International African American professional sorority for women in the field of education. It was founded on May 23, 1923, in Jersey City, New Jersey.

== History ==
Gladys Merritt Ross, a teacher in Jersey City, New Jersey, held an organizational meeting with other teachers on March 30, 1923 to discuss forming an educational sorority for African American women who were prohibited from joining existing organizations due to segregation. Phi Delta Kappa was officially incorporated on May 23, 1923, as a sorority for women in the field of education.

Its founders were Julia Asbury Barnes, Ella Wells Butler, Marguerite Gross, Florence Steele Hunt, Edna McConnell, Gladys Cannon Nunery, Gladys Merritt Ross, and Mildred Morris Williams. Because the founders were all minors, their parents and guardians became the sorority's trustees. Attorney J. Mercer Burrell helped the group to become incorporated.

In the 1940s, the sorority helped finance the Association for the Study of Negro Life and History and conducted subscriptions campaigns for The Negro History Bulletin. In the 1970s, the sorority formed a youth group called Xinos to support academic achievement, community service, and leadership amongst high school girls.

As of 2024, the sorority has 5,000 members. It is a member of the Leadership Conference on Civil and Human Rights. Phi Delta Kappa's national headquarters is at 8233 South King Drive in Chicago, Illinois.

== Symbols ==
Phi Delta Kappa's colors are scarlet and gold. Its newsletter is The Courier and its magazine is The Krinon.

== Chapters ==
As of July 2022, Phi Delta Kappa has 146 chapters. Following is a list of chapters, with active chapters indicated in bold and inactive chapters in italics.

Chapter	Charter date	Location	Status	Ref.
Alpha	May 23, 1923	Jersey City, New Jersey	Active	
Beta	October 1924	Washington, D.C.	Active	
Gamma	October 12, 1925	Baltimore, Maryland	Active	
Epsilon	1926	Charleston, West Virginia	Active	(Note: Chapter was chartered at the West Virginia Colored Institute (now West Virginia State University) and later became a post-graduate chapter for female teachers, principals, and counselors actively engaged in the field.)
Zeta		Philadelphia, Pennsylvania	Active	
Eta	March 5, 1927	Camden, New Jersey	Active	
Theta	November 5, 1927	Brooklyn, New York	Active	
Iota	November 12, 1927	Atlantic City, New Jersey	Active	
Kappa		Youngstown, Ohio	Active	
Lambda		Charlotte, North Carolina	Active	
Mu	1931	Chicago, Illinois	Active	
Nu		Birmingham, Alabama	Active	
Xi	December 2, 1932	Chester, Pennsylvania	Active	
Omicron		Ensley, Alabama	Active	
Pi	1933	Trenton, New Jersey	Active	
Rho	1934	Wilmington, Delaware	Active	
Sigma		Cincinnati, Ohio	Active	
Tau		Indianapolis, Indiana	Active	
Upsilon		Tuskegee, Alabama	Active	
Phi		York, Pennsylvania	Active	
Chi		Detroit, Michigan	Active	
Psi		Mobile, Alabama	Active	
Alpha Alpha		Kansas City, Missouri	Active	
Alpha Beta		Nashville, Tennessee	Active	
Alpha Gamma		Jacksonville, Florida	Active	
Alpha Delta		Miami, Florida	Active	
Alpha Epsilon		Atlanta, Georgia	Active	
Alpha Zeta	February 13, 1943	Richmond, Virginia	Active	
Alpha Eta		Evansville, Indiana	Active	
Alpha Theta		New Orleans, Louisiana	Active	
Alpha Iota		Concord, North Carolina	Active	
Alpha Kappa		Tulsa, Oklahoma	Active	
Alpha Lambda		Norfolk, Virginia	Active	
Alpha Mu	November 1946	Annapolis, Maryland	Active	
Alpha Nu		St. Louis, Missouri	Active	
Alpha Xi		Cleveland, Ohio	Active	
Alpha Omicron		Tampa, Florida	Active	
Alpha Pi		Dover, Delaware	Active	
Alpha Rho		Dallas, Texas	Active	
Alpha Sigma		Fort Worth, Texas	Active	
Alpha Tau		Roanoke, Virginia	Active	
Alpha Upsilon		Danville, Kentucky	Active	
Alpha Phi		Pensacola, Florida	Active	
Alpha Chi		Portsmouth, Virginia	Active	
Alpha Psi		Beckley, West Virginia	Active	
Beta Alpha		Shreveport, Louisiana	Active	
Beta Beta		Montgomery, Alabama	Active	
Beta Gamma		Toledo, Ohio	Active	
Beta Delta		Dayton, Ohio	Active	
Beta Epsilon	2021	New York, New York	Active	
Beta Zeta	1954	Durham, North Carolina	Active	
Beta Eta		Memphis, Tennessee	Active	
Beta Theta		Los Angeles, California	Active	
Beta Iota		Akron, Ohio	Active	
Beta Kappa		West Palm Beach, Florida	Active	
Beta Lambda	December 18, 1955 – 19xx ?; December 18, 1955	Winston-Salem, North Carolina	Active	
Beta Mu		Gary, Indiana	Active	
Beta Nu		San Francisco, California	Active	
Beta Xi		Orlando, Florida	Active	
Beta Omicron	1957	Jamaica, New York	Active	
Beta Pi		Chattanooga, Tennessee	Active	
Beta Rho		Texarkana, Texas	Active	
Beta Sigma		Lakeland, Florida	Active	
Beta Tau		Salisbury, Maryland	Active	
Beta Upsilon		Pittsburgh, Pennsylvania	Active	
Beta Phi		Compton, California	Active	
Beta Chi		Milwaukee, Wisconsin	Active	
Beta Psi		Knoxville, Tennessee	Active	
Gamma Alpha		Columbus, Ohio	Active	
Gamma Beta		Kansas City, Kansas	Active	
Gamma Gamma		Panama City, Florida	Active	
Gamma Delta		Flint, Michigan	Active	
Gamma Epsilon		Oklahoma City, Oklahoma	Active	
Gamma Zeta		Monrovia, Liberia	Active	
Gamma Eta		St. Augustine, Florida	Active	
Gamma Theta		Brewton, Alabama	Active	
Gamma Iota		Sacramento, California	Active	
Gamma Kappa		Saginaw, Michigan	Active	
Gamma Lambda		Pasadena, California	Active	
Gamma Mu		Virginia Beach, Virginia	Active	
Gamma Nu		Little Rock, Arkansas	Active	
Gamma Xi		El Cerrito, California	Active	
Gamma Omicron		Miami, Florida	Active	
Gamma Pi		Paducah, Kentucky	Active	
Gamma Rho		Shaker Heights, Ohio	Active	
Gamma Sigma		Las Vegas, Nevada	Active	
Gamma Tau		San Antonio, Texas	Active	
Gamma Upsilon		Waco, Texas	Active	
Gamma Phi		Fresno, California	Active	
Gamma Chi		Charleston, South Carolina	Active	
Gamma Psi		Jackson, Tennessee	Active	
Delta Alpha		Inkster, Michigan	Active	
Delta Beta		Austin, Texas	Active	
Delta Gamma		Virginia Beach, Virginia	Active	
Delta Delta	September 29, 1979	Jacksonville, Florida	Active	
Delta Epsilon		Dallas, Texas	Active	
Delta Zeta		Waycross, Georgia	Active	
Delta Eta		Ocala, Florida	Active	
Delta Theta		Daytona Beach, Florida	Active	
Delta Iota		Lake City, Florida	Active	
Delta Kappa		Inglewood, California	Active	
Delta Lambda		Egg Harbor Township, New Jersey	Active	
Delta Mu		Memphis, Tennessee	Active	
Delta Nu		Bergen County, New Jersey	Active	
Delta Xi		Long Beach and Carson, California	Active	
Delta Omicron		Muskogee, Oklahoma	Active	
Delta Pi	June 19, 1982	Hillside, New Jersey	Active	
Delta Rho		San Bernardino, California	Active	
Delta Sigma		Jefferson City, Missouri	Active	
Delta Tau		Wichita, Kansas	Active	
Delta Upsilon		San Diego, California	Active	
Delta Phi	April 9, 1983	North Haven, Connecticut	Active	
Delta Chi		Houston, Texas	Active	
Delta Psi		Gainesville, Florida	Active	
Epsilon Alpha		Somerset, New Jersey	Active	
Epsilon Beta		Tyler, Texas	Active	
Epsilon Gamma		Plano, Texas	Active	
Epsilon Delta		Lawton, Oklahoma	Active	
Epsilon Epsilon		Langston, Oklahoma	Active	
Epsilon Zeta		Ennis, Texas	Active	
Epsilon Eta		New Bern, North Carolina	Active	
Epsilon Theta		Beaumont, Texas	Active	
Epsilon Iota		Galveston, Texas	Active	
Epsilon Kappa		Barbados	Active	
Epsilon Lambda		Orange, Texas	Active	
Epsilon Mu		Bainbridge, Georgia	Active	
Epsilon Nu		Moreno Valley, California	Active	
Epsilon Xi		Forest Park, Ohio	Active	
Epsilon Omicron		Spokane, Washington	Active	
Epsilon Pi		Arlington, Texas	Active	
Epsilon Rho		Homer and Minden, Louisiana	Active	
Epsilon Sigma		Gastonia, North Carolina	Active	
Epsilon Tau		Decatur, Georgia	Active	
Epsilon Upsilon		Greensboro, North Carolina	Active	
Epsilon Phi		Evanston, Illinois	Active	
Epsilon Chi		Spring Valley, New York	Active	
Epsilon Psi		Jackson, Mississippi	Active	
Zeta Alpha		Mesquite, Texas	Active	
Zeta Beta		Port Arthur, Texas	Active	
Zeta Gamma		Maywood, Illinois	Active	
Zeta Delta		Selma, Alabama	Active	
Zeta Epsilon	May 16, 2021	Neptune Township, New Jersey	Active	
Zeta Zeta	2021	Rochester, New York	Active	
Zeta Eta	2021	Westchester, New York	Active	
Zeta Theta	2021	Phoenix, Arizona	Active	
Zeta Iota	2022	Upper Marlboro, Maryland	Active	

== Notable members ==
- Pearlie Craft Dove, college professor
- Consuelo Milner, scientist, cryptographer, and teacher
- Lemoine Deleaver Pierce (1957), educator and international and domestic relations mediator.
- Barbara Sizemore, superintendent of District of Columbia Public Schools

=== National honorary members ===
- Mary McLeod Bethune, educator and civil rights leader
- Barbara Bush (1991), First Lady of the United States
- Shirley Chisholm, United States Congress
- Mary Frances Early (2021), the first African-American to earn a degree from the University of Georgia and namesake of the University of Georgia Mary Frances Early College of Education
- Zelma Watson George, opera singer and delegate to United Nations General Assembly
- Irma P. Hall (2007), actress
- Charlemae Hill Rollins, pioneering librarian, author, and storyteller in the area of African-American literature
- Anna Arnold Hedgeman, civil rights leader and the first African-American woman to hold a cabinet post in New York
- Ella P. Stewart, America's first Black female pharmacist
- Merze Tate, history professor at Howard University
- Bazoline Estelle Usher (1950), an educator known for her work in the Atlanta Public Schools

== See also ==
- Professional fraternities and sororities
