= List of Kappa Phi Kappa chapters =

Kappa Phi Kappa is an American professional fraternity for students in education. It was organized in 1922 at Dartmouth College. It currently has one active chapter at Ohio State University. In the following chapter list, active chapters are indicated in bold and inactive chapters are in italics.

Chapter	Charter date and range	Institution	Location	Status	Ref.
Alpha	1922–1937, 1950	Dartmouth College	Hanover, New Hampshire	Inactive	
Beta	1922	Lafayette College	Easton, Pennsylvania	Inactive	
Gamma	1923	University of Maine	Orono, Maine	Inactive	
Delta	1923–19xx ?, 1937	Colby College	Waterville, Maine	Inactive	
Epsilon	1923	Gettysburg College	Gettysburg, Pennsylvania	Inactive	
Zeta	1923–1937, 1950	Allegheny College	Meadville, Pennsylvania	Inactive	
Eta	1923	Wittenberg University	Springfield, Ohio	Inactive	
Theta	1924–1936	Millikin University	Decatur, Illinois	Inactive	
Iota	1924–1950, 1951	Emory and Henry College	Emory, Virginia	Inactive	
Kappa	1924	Birmingham–Southern College	Birmingham, Alabama	Inactive	
Lambda	1924	University of Pennsylvania	Philadelphia, Pennsylvania	Inactive	
Mu	1925–1939	Middlebury College	Middlebury, Vermont	Inactive	
Nu	1925	Syracuse University	Syracuse, New York	Inactive	
Xi	1925	Miami University	Oxford, Ohio	Inactive	
Omicron	1925–1936	Washington and Lee University	Lexington, Virginia	Inactive	
Pi	1925–1936	College of William & Mary	Williamsburg, Virginia	Inactive	
Rho	1925–1936	Drake University	Des Moines, Iowa	Inactive	
Sigma	1926–1936	Wake Forest University	Winston-Salem, North Carolina	Inactive	
Tau	1926	University of Pittsburgh	Pittsburgh, Pennsylvania	Inactive	
Upsilon	1926–1936	University of Rochester	Rochester, New York	Inactive	
Phi	1926–1954	Hamline University	Saint Paul, Minnesota	Inactive	
Chi	1927	Teachers College, Columbia University	New York City, New York	Inactive	
Psi	1927–1953	Muhlenberg College	Allentown, Pennsylvania	Inactive	
Omega	19xx ?	At-Large	United States	Inactive	(Note: This was a chapter-at-large for those people who become members but are not affiliated with a chapter at a college campus.)
Alpha Alpha	1927	Temple University	Philadelphia, Pennsylvania	Inactive	
Alpha Beta	1927–1950, 1951	Pennsylvania State University	State College, Pennsylvania	Inactive	
Alpha Gamma	1927	University of Vermont	Burlington, Vermont	Inactive	
Alpha Delta	1927–1929	Centre College	Danville, Kentucky	Inactive	
Alpha Epsilon	1927–1954	Emory University	Atlanta, Georgia	Inactive	
Alpha Zeta	1928–1937	Boston University	Boston, Massachusetts	Inactive	
**Alpha Eta**	1928	Ohio State University	Columbus, Ohio	Active	(Note: Chapter formed from a chapter of Sigma Delta Sigma in a 1928 merger of the two similar education fraternities.)
Alpha Theta	1928–1946	Colgate University	Hamilton, New York	Inactive	
Alpha Iota	1929	Howard University	Washington, D.C.	Inactive	
Alpha Kappa	1929–1936	University of Maryland, College Park	College Park, Maryland	Inactive	
Alpha Lambda	1929–1935	University of Florida	Gainesville, Florida	Inactive	
Alpha Mu	1929	Mercer University	Macon, Georgia	Inactive	
Alpha Nu	1929–1935	University of Illinois Urbana-Champaign	Champaign, Illinois	Inactive	
Alpha Xi	1930	Bucknell University	Lewisburg, Pennsylvania	Inactive	
Alpha Omicron	1930	New York University	New York City, New York	Inactive	
Alpha Pi	1947	University of South Carolina	Columbia, South Carolina	Inactive	
Alpha Rho	1930–1932, 1935–1939	College of Wooster	Wooster, Ohio	Inactive	
Alpha Sigma	1931–1935, 1939	North Carolina State University	Raleigh, North Carolina	Inactive	
Alpha Tau	1931–1939	Illinois State University	Normal, Illinois	Inactive	
Alpha Upsilon	1932–1939	Southern Illinois University Carbondale	Carbondale, Illinois	Inactive	
Alpha Phi	1934–1956	Cornell University	Ithaca, New York	Inactive	
Alpha Chi	1934–1946, 1948–1955	Rutgers University	New Brunswick, New Jersey	Inactive	
Alpha Psi	1934	Louisiana State University	Baton Rouge, Louisiana	Inactive	
Alpha Omega	193x ?			Inactive	
Beta Alpha	1937–1939	Coe College	Cedar Rapids, Iowa	Inactive	
Beta Beta	1937	Moravian College	Bethlehem, Pennsylvania	Inactive	
Beta Gamma	19xx ?			Inactive	
Beta Delta	19xx ?			Inactive	
Beta Epsilon	1940	Vanderbilt Peabody College of Education and Human Development	Nashville, Tennessee	Inactive	
Beta Zeta	1948	Point Loma Nazarene University	San Diego, California,	Inactive	
Beta Eta	1948	Jacksonville State University	Jacksonville, Alabama	Inactive	
Beta Theta	1949–1953	State University of New York at Oswego	Oswego, New York	Inactive	
Beta Iota	1949–1952	Southern Methodist University	Dallas, Texas	Inactive	
Beta Kappa	1950	Arizona State University	Tempe, Arizona	Inactive	
Beta Lambda	1950	Villanova University	Villanova, Pennsylvania	Inactive	
Beta Mu	1951	Furman University	Greenville, South Carolina	Inactive	
Beta Nu	1951	Clemson University	Clemson, South Carolina	Inactive	
Beta Xi	1952–1954	Texas Tech University	Lubbock, Texas	Inactive	
Beta Omicron	1953–1953	Virginia State University	Ettrick, Virginia	Inactive	
Beta Pi	1954	Duquesne University	Pittsburgh, Pennsylvania	Inactive	
Beta Rho	1954	American University	Washington, D.C.	Inactive	
Beta Sigma	1954	Idaho State University	Pocatello, Idaho	Inactive	
Beta Tau	1955	Saint Louis University	St. Louis, Missouri	Inactive	
Beta Upsilon	1956	University of Georgia	Athens, Georgia	Inactive	
Beta Phi	1956	Southern University	Baton Rouge, Louisiana	Inactive	
Beta Chi	1957	Georgia Southern University	Statesboro, Georgia	Inactive	
Beta Psi	1958	Montana State University Billings	Billings, Montana	Inactive	
Beta Omega	19xx ?			Inactive	
Gamma Alpha	1960	Saint Michael's College	Colchester, Vermont	Inactive	
Gamma Beta	1962	Johnson State College	Johnson, Vermont	Inactive	
Gamma Gamma	1965	Louisiana College	Pineville, Louisiana	Inactive	
Gamma Delta	1967	Boston College	Chestnut Hill, Massachusetts	Inactive	
Gamma Epsilon	196x ?			Inactive	
Gamma Zeta	1969	California University of Pennsylvania	California, Pennsylvania	Inactive	
