= List of Kappa Delta Epsilon chapters =

Chapters of American professional fraternity

Kappa Delta Epsilon is a professional fraternity for students in education. It was organized on March 25, 1933. In the following list, active chapters are indicated in bold and inactive chapters are in italics.

| Chapter | Charter date and range | Institution or area | Location | Status | Ref. |
|---|---|---|---|---|---|
| Alpha | 1933 | Allegheny College | Meadville, Pennsylvania | Inactive | |
| Beta | 1933 | Birmingham-Southern College | Birmingham, Alabama | Inactive | |
| Gamma | 1933 | Cornell University | Ithaca, New York | Inactive | |
| **Delta** | 1933 | Atlanta Area Alumni | Atlanta, Georgia | Active | |
| **Epsilon** | 1933 | Illinois State University | Normal, Illinois | Active | |
| Zeta | 1933 | Temple University | Philadelphia, Pennsylvania | Inactive | |
| Eta | 1936 | Hamline University | St. Paul, Minnesota | Inactive | |
| Theta | 1938 | Bucknell University | Lewisburg, Pennsylvania | Inactive | |
| Iota | 1939 | Gettysburg College | Gettysburg, Pennsylvania | Inactive | |
| Kappa | 1940 | Mercer University | Macon, Georgia | Active | |
| Lambda | 1941 | Millsaps College | Jackson, Mississippi | Inactive | |
| Mu | 1946 | Mississippi University for Women | Columbus, Mississippi | Inactive | |
| Nu | 1950 | Northern Arizona University | Flagstaff, Arizona | Inactive | |
| Xi | 1950 | Emory and Henry College | Emory, Virginia | Inactive | |
| **Omicron** | 1950 | Birmingham Southern Alumni | Birmingham, Alabama | Active | |
| Pi | 1950 | University of South Carolina | Columbia, South Carolina | Inactive | |
| Rho | 1950 | Belhaven College | Jackson, Mississippi | Inactive | |
| Sigma | 1951 | Furman University | Greenville, South Carolina | Inactive | |
| Tau | 1952 | University of Pennsylvania | Philadelphia, Pennsylvania | Inactive | |
| Upsilon | 1952 | New York University | New York, New York | Inactive | |
| Phi | 1953 | Southern Connecticut State University | New Haven, Connecticut | Inactive | |
| Chi | 1954 | Jacksonville State University | Jacksonville, Alabama | Inactive | |
| Psi | 1954 | Point Loma College | San Diego, California | Inactive | |
| Omega | 1954 | Samford University | Birmingham, Alabama | Inactive | |
| Alpha Alpha | 1954 | Idaho State University | Pocatello, Idaho | Inactive | |
| Alpha Beta | 1955 | Columbia College | Columbia, South Carolina | Inactive | |
| Alpha Gamma | 1955 | The American University | Washington, D.C. | Inactive | |
| Alpha Delta | 1955 | University of South Carolina Alumni | Columbia, South Carolina | Inactive | |
| Alpha Epsilon | 1956 | University of Georgia | Athens, Georgia | Inactive | |
| Alpha Zeta | 1956 | Limestone College | Gaffney, South Carolina | Inactive | |
| Alpha Eta | 1956 | Wittenberg University | Springfield, Ohio | Inactive | |
| Alpha Theta | 1957 | Moravian College | Bethlehem, Pennsylvania | Inactive | |
| **Alpha Iota** | 1958 | Samford University Alumni | Birmingham, Alabama | Active | |
| **Alpha Kappa** | 1958 | Duquesne University | Pittsburgh, Pennsylvania | Active | |
| Alpha Lambda | 1958 | Georgia Southern College | Statesboro, Georgia | Inactive | |
| Alpha Mu | 1958 | Peabody College | Nashville, Tennessee | Inactive | |
| Alpha Nu | 1959 | Eastern Montana College | Billings, Montana | Inactive | |
| Alpha Xi | 1959 | Emory University | Atlanta, Georgia | Inactive | |
| Alpha Omicron | 1959 | Wesleyan College | Macon, Georgia | Inactive | |
| Alpha Pi | 1960 | Philadelphia Area Alumni | Philadelphia, Pennsylvania | Inactive | |
| Alpha Rho | 1960 | State University of New York at Albany | Albany, New York | Inactive | |
| Alpha Sigma | 1961 | University of Alabama | Tuscaloosa, Alabama | Inactive | |
| Alpha Tau | 1963 | Johnson State College | Johnson, Vermont | Inactive | |
| Alpha Upsilon | 1965 | Louisiana College | Pineville, Louisiana | Inactive | |
| Alpha Phi | 1965 | Macon Area Alumni | Macon, Georgia | Inactive | |
| Alpha Chi | 1966 | University of Maine | Gorham, Maine | Inactive | |
| Alpha Psi | 1968 | Boston College | Chestnut Hill, Massachusetts | Inactive | |
| Alpha Omega | 1968 | Miami University | Oxford, Ohio | Inactive | |
| Beta Alpha | 1968 | State University of New York at Plattsburgh | Plattsburgh, New York | Inactive | |
| Beta Beta | 1968 | Georgia State University | Atlanta, Georgia | Inactive | |
| Beta Gamma | 1968 | Loyola University | Chicago, Illinois | Inactive | |
| **Beta Delta** | 1969 | Louisiana State University | Baton Rouge, Louisiana | Active | |
| Beta Epsilon | 1970 | California University of Pennsylvania | California, Pennsylvania | Inactive | |
| Beta Zeta | 1970 | Dunbarton College of Holy Cross | Washington, D.C. | Inactive | |
| Beta Eta | 1974 | Gorham Area Alumni | Gorham, Maine | Inactive | |
| Beta Theta | 1974 | New Haven Area Alumni | New Haven, Connecticut | Inactive | |
| **Beta Iota** | 1975 | University of Alabama at Birmingham | Birmingham, Alabama | Active | |
| Beta Kappa | 1975 | Carlow University | Pittsburgh, Pennsylvania | Inactive | |
| Beta Lambda | 1975 | Southern University | Baton Rouge, Louisiana | Inactive | |
| Beta Mu | 1978 | Franciscan University of Steubenville | Steubenville, Ohio | Inactive | |
| Beta Nu | 1979 | Greesnburg Area Alumni | Greensburg, Pennsylvania | Inactive | |
| Beta Xi | 1980 | Duquesne University Alumni | Pittsburgh, Pennsylvania | Inactive | |
| Beta Omicron | 1982 | Mercer University, Atlanta Campus | Atlanta, Georgia | Inactive | |
| Beta Pi | 1982 | Clark Atlanta University | Atlanta, Georgia | Inactive | |
| **Beta Rho** | 1982 | Judson College | Marion, Alabama | Active | |
| Beta Sigma | 1982 | University of Alabama Alumni | Tuscaloosa, Alabama | Inactive | |
| Beta Tau | 1982 | Universidad Regiomontana | Monterrey, Nuevo León, Mexico | Inactive | |
| Beta Upsilon | 1982 | University of Mobile | Mobile, Alabama | Inactive | |
| Beta Phi | 1983 | Washington D.C. Area Alumni | Washington, D.C. | Inactive | |
| Beta Chi | 1985 | Louisiana State University Alumni | Baton Rouge, Louisiana | Inactive | |
| **Beta Psi** | 1986 | Spelman College | Atlanta, Georgia | Active | |
| **Beta Omega** | 1986 | University of Alabama at Birmingham Alumni | Birmingham, Alabama | Active | |
| Gamma Alpha | 1988 | Alice Lloyd College | Pippa Passes, Kentucky | Inactive | |
| Gamma Beta | 1988 | Jacksonville State University Alumni | Jacksonville, Alabama | Inactive | |
| **Gamma Gamma** | 1990 | Caldwell University | Caldwell, New Jersey | Active | |
| Gamma Delta | 1990 | University of Nevada at Las Vegas | Las Vegas, Nevada | Inactive | |
| Gamma Epsilon | 1990 | Fort Valley State College | Fort Valley, Georgia | Inactive | |
| **Gamma Zeta** | 1991 | Centenary University | Hackettstown, New Jersey | Active | |
| Gamma Eta | 1991 | Mississippi Gulf Coast Area Alumni | Pascagoula, Mississippi | Inactive | |
| Gamma Theta | 1992 | Huntingdon College | Montgomery, Alabama | Inactive | |
| Gamma Iota | 1992 | Clarksville Area Alumni | Huntsville, Alabama | Inactive | |
| Gamma Kappa | 1992 | Huntsville Area Alumni | Huntsville, Alabama | Inactive | |
| **Gamma Lambda** | 1992 | Palm Beach Atlantic University | West Palm Beach, Florida | Active | |
| Gamma Mu | 1993 | Central Michigan University | Mount Pleasant, Michigan | Inactive | |
| Gamma Nu | 1993 | Alabama A & M University | Normal, Alabama | Inactive | |
| Gamma Xi | 1993 | University of the Incarnate Word | San Antonio, Texas | Inactive | |
| **Gamma Omicron** | 1994 | Washington and Jefferson College | Washington, Pennsylvania | Active | |
| Gamma Pi | 1994 | Hillsdale College | Hillsdale, Michigan | Inactive | |
| Gamma Rho | 1994 | Fort Valley State University | Fort Valley, Georgia | Inactive | |
| Gamma Sigma | 1996 | Thomasville Georgia Area Alumni | Thomasville, Georgia | Inactive | |
| Gamma Tau | 1996 | Jackson Area Alumni | Jackson, Mississippi | Inactive | |
| **Gamma Upsilon** | 1997 | La Roche University | Pittsburgh, Pennsylvania | Active | |
| Gamma Phi | 1998 | Rhodes College | Memphis, Tennessee | Inactive | |
| Gamma Chi | 1998 | Converse College | Spartanburg, South Carolina | Inactive | |
| Gamma Psi | 1998 | Our Lady of the Lake University | San Antonio, Texas | Inactive | |
| Gamma Omega | 1998 | Sierra Nevada College | Incline Village, Nevada | Inactive | |
| Delta Alpha | 1999 | Augusta University | Augusta, Georgia | Inactive | |
| **Delta Beta** | 2000 | Chestnut Hill College | Philadelphia, Pennsylvania | Active | |
| **Delta Gamma** | 2003 | Charlotte Area Alumni | Charlotte, North Carolina | Active | |
| Delta Delta | 2003 | Norfolk State University | Norfolk, Virginia | Inactive | |
| Delta Epsilon | 2006 | University of New Orleans | New Orleans, Louisiana | Inactive | |
| **Delta Zeta** | 2009 | Florida SouthWestern State College | Fort Myers, Florida | Active | |
| **Delta Eta** | 2010 | University of the Pacific | Stockton, California | Active | |
| Delta Theta | 2016 | Cincinnati Area Alumni | Cincinnati, Ohio | Inactive | |
| **Delta Iota** | 2017 | Texas A&M International University | Laredo, Texas | Active | |
| **Delta Theta** | 2017 | Talladega College | Talladega, Alabama | Active | |
| **Delta Lambda** | 2021 | Texas A&M University–Central Texas | Killeen, Texas | Active | |
