= Barbara Sizemore =

American academic

Superintendent of District of Columbia Public Schools
- In office August 8, 1973 – October 9, 1975
- Preceded by: Floretta McKenzie (acting)
- Succeeded by: Vincent Reed

Personal details
- Born: December 17, 1927 Chicago, Illinois, U.S.
- Died: July 24, 2004 (aged 76) Chicago, Illinois, U.S.
- Education: Northwestern University (BA, MA); University of Chicago (PhD)

Barbara Ann Sizemore (December 17, 1927 – July 24, 2004) was an American teacher and researcher in the field of education. In 1973, she became the first African American woman to head the public school system in a major city, when she was elected superintendent of District of Columbia Public Schools.

== Early life and education ==
Barbara Ann Sizemore was born to Sylvester and Delila Lafoon in Chicago, Illinois, and was raised in Terre Haute, Indiana. She attended segregated elementary and middle schools and graduated from high school at the age of 16. Sizemore attended Northwestern University, where she received a bachelor's degree in classical languages in 1947 and a master's degree in elementary education in 1954. She later returned to school and received a PhD from the University of Chicago in educational administration in 1979.

== Career ==
Sizemore began her career in Chicago public schools, teaching English and reading in elementary and high schools from 1950 to 1963, and serving as principal of elementary and high schools from 1963 to 1967. In 1969 she was named district superintendent of the Woodlawn Experimental Schools. She was also a member of the adjunct faculty at Northeastern Illinois University from 1965 to 1971. Sizemore taught at the University of Pittsburgh from 1975 to 1992. It was there that she began her research on low-income African American students and standardized tests, which she continued as dean of the School of Education at DePaul University in 1992. Sizemore's first book, a version of her doctoral thesis titled The Ruptured Diamond: The Politics of the Decentralization of the District of Columbia Public Schools, was published in 1981. Her second book, Walking in Circles: The Black Struggle for School Reform was published posthumously in 2008.

== Awards and honors ==
Sizemore served as Professor Emerita at DePaul University, and a scholar in residence at the National Alliance of Black School Educators from the 1970s until her death. She was the recipient of four honorary doctorates and was a member of Delta Sigma Theta sorority, the Urban League, NAACP, and Phi Delta Kappa. She received a lifetime achievement award from the Research Focus on Black Education special interest group of the American Education Research Association. The School of Education at Duquesne University named the Barbara A. Sizemore Distinguished Professorship in Urban Education in her honor.
