= Al-Qalqashandi =

Egyptian polymath and mathematician (1355/56–1418)

- Born: Shihāb al-Dīn Abū 'l-Abbās Aḥmad ibn ‘Alī ibn Aḥmad ‘Abd Allāh al-Fazārī al-Shāfiʿī; 1355 or 1356; Nile Delta, Egypt
- Died: 1418 (aged 62–63)
- Occupations: Encyclopedist, Polymath, Mathematician
- Notable work: Ṣubḥ al-Aʿshá

Shihāb al-Dīn Abū 'l-Abbās Aḥmad ibn ‘Alī ibn Aḥmad ‘Abd Allāh al-Fazārī al-Shāfiʿī better known by the epithet al-Qalqashandī (Arabic: شهاب الدين أحمد بن علي بن أحمد القلقشندي; 1355 or 1356 – 1418), was a medieval Arab Egyptian encyclopedist, polymath and mathematician. A native of the Nile Delta, he became a Scribe of the Scroll (Katib al-Darj), or clerk of the Mamluk chancery in Cairo, Egypt. His magnum opus is the voluminous administrative encyclopedia Ṣubḥ al-Aʿshá.

== Ṣubḥ al-aʿshā ==
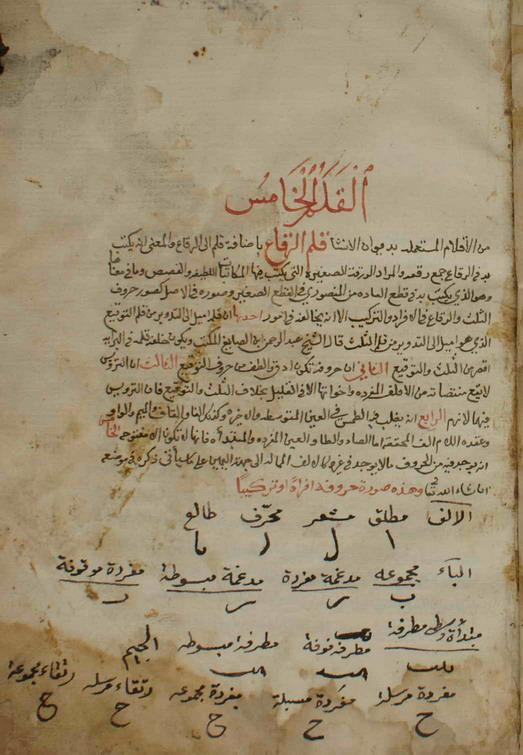
Ṣubḥ al-aʿshā, published 1193 AH

Ṣubḥ al-Aʿshá fī Ṣināʿat al-Inshāʾ ('The Dawn of the Blind' or 'Daybreak for the Night-Blind regarding the Composition of Chancery Documents'); a fourteen-volume encyclopedia completed in 1412, is an administrative manual on geography, political history, natural history, zoology, mineralogy, cosmography, and time measurement. Based on the Masālik al-abṣār fī mamālik al-amṣar of Shihab al-Umari, it has been called "one of the final expressions of the genre of Arabic administrative literature". Selections on "Seats of Government " and "Regulations of the Kingdom " from Early Islam to the Mamluks' have been published separately.

The Ṣubḥ al-aʿshā was cited by David Kahn as the first published discussion of the substitution and transposition of ciphers, and the first description of a polyalphabetic cipher, in which each plaintext letter is assigned more than one substitution. The exposition on cryptanalysis included the use of tables of letter frequencies and sets of letters which cannot occur together in one word. Kahn therefore cited it as the first work in human history that described cryptology, because it described both cryptography and cryptanalysis. Al-Qalqashandi quoted the text relevant to cryptology from the work of Ibn al-Durayhim (1312–1361) that was once considered lost. Later discoveries in Istanbul‟s Sulaimaniyyah Ottoman Archives did not just find the work by Ibn Duraihim, but also works of al-Kindi in the 9th century that is now considered the oldest work on cryptology.

== Sources ==
- Bosworth, C. E. (1978). "al-Ḳalḳas̲h̲andī". In van Donzel, E.; Lewis, B.; Pellat, Ch. & Bosworth, C. E. (eds.). The Encyclopaedia of Islam, Second Edition. Volume IV: Iran–Kha. Leiden: E. J. Brill. pp. 509–511. doi:10.1163/1573-3912_islam_SIM_3832. OCLC 758278456.
