= Ailsa Maxwell =

British Bletchley Park code breaker and historian (1922-2020)

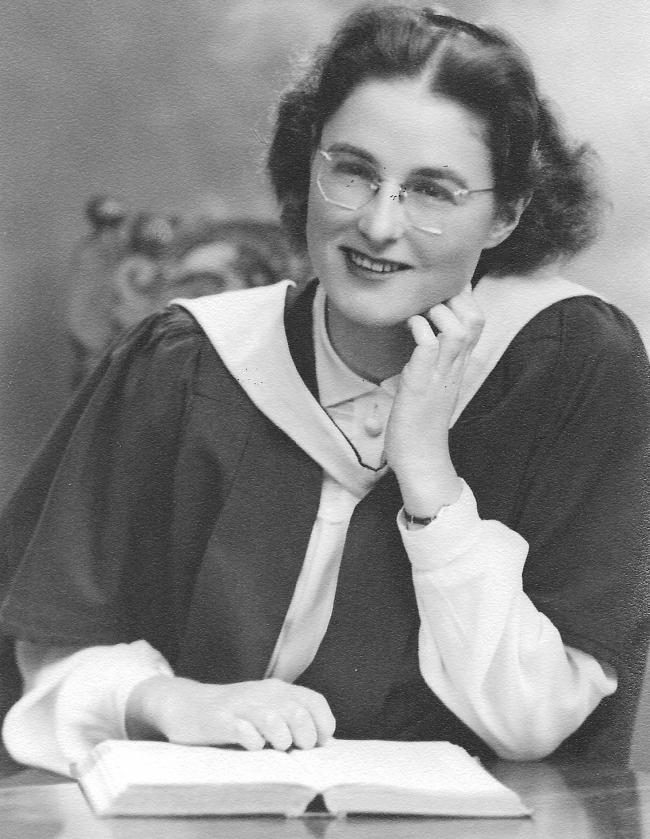
- Born: Ailsa Giles Macdonald; 16 December 1922; Gourock
- Died: 10 February 2020 (aged 97); Portobello
- Occupations: Cryptologist, code breaker and historian
- Employer: National Museum of Scotland
- Spouse: Stuart Maxwell

Ailsa Giles Maxwell (née Macdonald; 16 December 1922 – 10 February 2020) was a British Bletchley Park code breaker and historian.

== Early life and education ==
Ailsa Giles Macdonald was born in Gourock on 16 December 1922, to Douglas Macdonald a railway manager, and his wife Grace, a school teacher. The family moved to London when her father was transferred to Euston Station, and Ailsa began her schooling in the city. She completed her schooling at Dumfries Academy, and then took up a place at the University of Edinburgh in 1942 to study economics.

== Bletchley Park ==
After completing the first year of her economics degree with distinction, Maxwell planned to join the WRENS, however she was approached by the Foreign Office in the summer of 1943, and invited to interview for an unspecified job. A fellow student of History at her university, Cecily Giles, was also made a similar offer. She and Maxwell accepted the offer and Maxwell was appointed to work as a Temporary Assistant at Station X, the UK's World War II code-breaking centre at Bletchley Park, in Buckinghamshire. She was billeted in a house with Wolverton along with a group of other young women.

After receiving two weeks training, Maxwell was appointed to Hut 6 where she worked in the Block D machine room. Maxwell was responsible for compiling menus from information obtained by other huts and inputting it to the electro-mechanical codebreaking Bombe, as part of the effort to decipher the Germans' Enigma code. Speaking to the Bletchley Park Oral History project, Maxwell described her work as follows.

"Our main job was, when a stop from the Bombes satisfied the way it had been set up, we then set this up on the Enigma machines to see whether it was right. We didn't know German, but it was obvious whether what came out was nonsense or made sense. I enjoyed it when we made up programmes, it was fun and something unusual to do."

On the night of 7 May 1945 Maxwell was working along with Asa Briggs of the Intelligence Corps when the station received the uncoded message from Hitler's successor and President of Germany, Admiral Karl Dönitz, announcing Germany's unconditional surrender. Maxwell's service at Bletchley Park ended the following day on 8 May 1945, VE Day. She was required to sign the Official Secrets Act and did not speak about her experiences until some time after the work of the code-breaking operation was declassified in 1974.

== Post-war research career ==
Immediately after the war Maxwell returned to Scotland to finish her Economics degree at the University of Edinburgh and assist with the 1945 General Election in Scotland. She then worked for a period as a researcher at the Department of Health for Scotland. Later, Maxwell worked as a research assistant in the University of Edinburgh's Department of Economic History, where she worked on a project led by Michael Flinn that led to the publication of Scottish Population History from the 17th Century to the 1930s. Following this, Maxwell worked at the General Register Office for Scotland. She also undertook a number of research projects with her husband, including the history of Scottish silversmiths and goldsmiths, and together they translated the diary of George Home (1660-1705) from Berwickshire.

== Personal life ==
While completing her degree at the University of Edinburgh, Maxwell met her husband Stuart Maxwell, who went on to become deputy keeper at the National Museum of Scotland. The couple married in 1953 and had two sons, Ian and Sandy. For much of their lives, Maxwell and her husband lived at Dick Place in The Grange area Edinburgh.

Maxwell was pre-deceased by her husband and spent the final year of her life in care in Portobello. She died on 10 February 2020, at the age of 97.

== In fiction ==
Maxwell's war-time experiences at Bletchley Park, partially inspired the novel The Amber Shadows by Lucy Ribchester.

== See also ==
- Women in Bletchley Park
- List of women in Bletchley Park
