= J. Mercer Burrell =

American politician (1969)

J. Mercer Burrell (November 21, 1890 – June 15, 1969) was an American civil rights leader, lawyer, and politician. He was one of the first Black state legislators in New Jersey. He was the defense attorney for the Trenton Six in 1951.

== Early life ==
Burrell was born in Richmond, Virginia on November 21, 1890. He graduated from Union University in Jackson, Tennessee. He received his law degree from the New Jersey Law School, now Rutgers Law School.

He served as a lieutenant in the U.S. Army during World War I. During the war, he was injured in France.

== Career ==
Burrell was an attorney. He represented the founders of the Phi Delta Kappa, filing the paperwork to incorporate the education sorority. He served in the New Jersey State House in 1933 as a Republican and 1935 under the Clean Government line. He was one of the first Black assemblymen in New Jersey.

From 1936 to 1937, Burrell was the special counsel for the New Jersey Department of Banking and Insurance. He was the special title attorney for the Newark Housing Authority from 1939 to 1940. In 1947, the Essex County Colored Republican Council was represented by Burrell as it sought to change the Bill of Rights.

In 1951, Burrell represented the Trenton Six in a new trial, ultimately winning freedom for four of the Black men who had been convicted of rape in 1948. This was a high profile case that trigged protest rallies and an appeal to the United Nations. In 1953, he ran unsuccessfully to be the Republican nominee for the 11th Congressional District.

He was also vice-president of the National Bar Association.

== Personal life ==
Burrell lived in New York and East Orange, New Jersey before moving to Newark, New Jersey in 1919.

Burrell died at his home in Newark on June 15, 1969, at the age of 73.
