= C. Lamont Smith =

American football sports agent

Charles Lamont Smith
- Occupation: Sports agent

Charles Lamont Smith is an American football sports agent, the founder and president of sports and entertainment representation firm All Pro Sports and Entertainment. Black Enterprise selected him as one of the top 50 black sports professionals in the country. Smith has been described by The New York Times as one of the most powerful sports agents in the country. Smith was honored by the Black Sports Agents Association as Agent of the Year in July 2001.

== Biography ==
Smith graduated magna cum laude from Clark Atlanta University. Smith worked for a time at the Atlanta television station WATL-TV as a production assistant; he also ushered at Atlanta Hawks basketball games. Smith decided to go back to school and graduated from Howard University Law School in 1984. Smith worked at the Denver law firm of Gorsuch, Kirgis, Campbell, Walker & Grover for three years in their sports marketing branch.

Smith started All Pro Sports and Entertainment (APSE) with $10,000 of his own money and $100,000 from an investor. In 1991, APSE grossed an estimated $2 million in revenues ($4.73 million adjusted for inflation).

== Clients ==
Smith represented former Tennessee Titans running back Eddie George, and negotiated him a six-year, $42 million contract that made him the highest-paid running back in the NFL. He represented Jerome Bettis with the Pittsburgh Steelers and got him a six-year $30 million contract extension; he represented Trevor Pryce, whose seven-year, $70 million deal with the Denver Broncos made him the highest-paid NFL defensive player as of 2000. Smith's firm has represented Barry Sanders (retired, Detroit Lions), Kevan Barlow (running back, San Francisco 49ers), Willie Roaf (offensive tackle, New Orleans Saints), Derrick Alexander (wide receiver, Kansas City Chiefs), Chad Brown (linebacker, Seattle Seahawks), Jason Gildon (linebacker, Pittsburgh Steelers), Pierre Thomas (Star running back/kickoff-returner for the New Orleans Saints) and others.

== Racial equity in sports representation ==
USA Today calls Smith a pioneer. Smith serves on the advisory board of the Black Entertainment and Sports Lawyers Association, an organization trying to increase minority participation in sports and entertainment.

Smith expressed frustration that although 14 of the 15 players selected in the first round of the 2004 NFL draft were black, only one selected a black agent to represent him. "What kind of message are we sending to African-American athletes when on the first day of the draft they turn on the TV and all they see are white guys in decision-making roles?" Smith said in an interview with ESPN. "The mentality of the player and decision-maker has to change," he said. "It can only change through education—becoming aware that if you get someone competent to do your deals, no matter their skin color, you'll pretty much be OK. But you have to give African-Americans a chance to come in and compete for the business."
