= Julia Wetzel =

Executive Director of the NSA

Julia Wetzel began her National Security Agency (NSA) career as a Special Research Analyst in the Operations unit. In the late 1970s, Wetzel worked with the House Select Committee on Intelligence. In 1989 she was assigned as the NSA's representative to the US State Department. Wetzel retired from the NSA in 1999 as the Executive Director, the third highest-ranking person in the agency.

Julia is listed as one of the Women in American Cryptology Honorees.

As the Soviet Union’s Communist regime collapsed, Wetzel was chief of a major operational analysis group. She saw the division through the critical time of the agency's restructuring to align with new threats.
