= Frenchy's (second-hand clothing) =

Frenchy's is a second-hand clothing retail phenomenon in Atlantic Canada, originating from Nova Scotia and extending into New Brunswick and Prince Edward Island.

The concept was started by Edwin "Frenchy" Theriault, who opened the first store in Meteghan, Nova Scotia in 1971. The business model involves importing large bales of donated clothing from the New England region of the United States, where they are sorted, graded, then sold at flat prices regardless of brand or condition.

== History ==
Edwin Theriault was born on June 6, 1932, and raised in Somerville, Massachusetts, the son of a Nova Scotian mother of Acadian descent. He was nicknamed "Frenchy" as a due to being the only French child in his neighbourhood. Theriault eventually moved to the Clare area, and in 1971 he bought a 1,000-pound bale of used clothing from Goodwill Industries and sold the pieces in Nova Scotia. After originally operating out of a relative's store in Little Brook, Theriault opened the first Frenchy's store in Meteghan, while also doing trade in rags.

Among Theriault's employees included Guy LeBlanc, an Acadian from Digby, who later established his own second-hand clothing business using the Frenchy's name in 1972 known as Guy's Frenchys. Theriault later stated that he had "headed [LeBlanc] in the right direction ... and he expanded on that" to a scale Theriault himself chose not to pursue.

In 2026, a musical premiered based on the thrift stores.

== Ecosystem of operators ==
By 2009, Theriault estimated that the amount of Atlantic Canadian second-hand stores that have stemmed directly or indirectly from his operations was approximately 150. Some used the Frenchy's name, while others operated under different branding. Other used clothing stores using the Frenchy's name have operated in both Prince Edward Island and New Brunswick. The most prominent business, Guy's Frenchys, operates 17 stores throughout Nova Scotia and New Brunswick.
