= Kappa Phi Kappa =

American professional fraternity for education

- ΚΦΚ
- Founded: April 25, 1922; 104 years ago (Incorporation date); Dartmouth College
- Type: Professional
- Affiliation: Independent
- Former affiliation: PIC
- Status: Active
- Emphasis: Education
- Scope: Local (previously national)
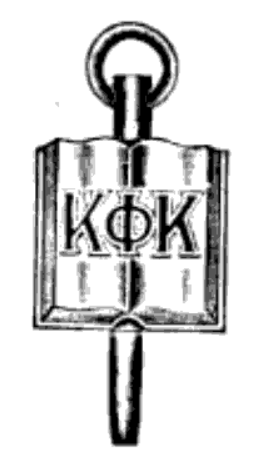
- Member badge
- Colors: Green and White
- Flower: White carnation
- Publication: The Open Book Magazine
- Chapters: 1 active, 68 chartered
- Headquarters: Arps Hall; 1945 North High St. Columbus, Ohio 43210; United States
- Website: osu-kpk.weebly.com

Kappa Phi Kappa (ΚΦΚ) is an American professional fraternity for students in education. It was organized in 1922 at Dartmouth College. It currently has one active chapter at Ohio State University.

== History ==
The idea behind the establishment of a national honor fraternity for college education students emerged from a meeting of the National Education Association in Chicago. Kappa Phi Kappa was founded at Dartmouth College as a men's professional fraternity in 1922. It was incorporated on April 25, 1922, in New Hampshire. Its founders were Thomas J. Byrne, Adam C. Gilliland, Wesley R. Jones, Riverda H. Jordan, James G. Stevens, and Arthur Wright.

Although, Jordan was later considered to be the honor fraternity's "father", unlike other fraternities, the incorporation of the national body preceded the organization of local chapters. February 28, 1922 is celebrated as Founders' Day as it was on that day that the first meeting to work out the detailed plans for the organization was held.

The Ohio State University chapter of Kappa Phi Kappa originated as a chapter of Sigma Delta Sigma, a fraternity with similar aims which brought two chapters into Kappa Phi Kappa with a 1928 merger. By June 1928, the fraternity had thirty chapters. The fraternity held a national convention at Wittenburg College in April 1929.

In 1933, the executive board of Kappa Phi Kappa invited representatives from six institutions together to form Kappa Delta Epsilon, a women's professional sorority supporting the field of education. In 1934, the fraternity became merger discussions with Phi Sigma Pi, an education honor society with 18 chapters and 500 members. The Ph Sigma Pi chapter at Northwestern Oklahoma State University voted to join Kappa Phi Kappa in June 1934.

By 1957, Kappa Phi Kappa had 37 active chapters, with 28 inactive, for a total of 65 chapters installed. By 1963, it had 40 active chapters, 28 inactive. However, closures continued to plague the fraternity; by 2016, the Alpha Eta chapter Ohio State University was the only remaining active chapter. Its offices are located at 1945 North High Street in Columbus, Ohio. It was a former member of the Professional Fraternity Association.

== Symbols ==
The badge is in the form of a key displaying an open book in dull gold with the Greek letters ΚΦΚ in black enamel in relief across the pages of the book. The fraternity's colors are green and white. Its flower is the white carnation.

Its quarterly publication was the Open Book Magazine of Kappa Phi Kappa. Additionally, the house organ, Closed Book, was circulated only among undergraduate members.

== Membership ==
Membership was originally limited to white male students who took courses in the Department of Education including graduate students and faculty. Provision was made for alumni and honorary membership. It admitted members belonging to undergraduate social fraternities and did not bar members from belonging to honorary or graduate organizations. By 1968, membership was open to all races, and the fraternity was similarly open to both genders.

== Chapters ==
Kappa Phi Kappa has chartered 68 chapters in the United States.

== Notable members ==
- J. L. Clifton, Head of the Ohio Public Schools
- William John Cooper, US Commissioner of Education and California State Superintendent of Public Instruction
- Francis P. Gaines, chancellor and president of Washington and Lee University and president of Wake Forest University
- Frank Reed Horton, founder and first national president of Alpha Phi Omega
- Riverda H. Jordan, professor of education at Cornell University
- John J. Tigert, U.S. Commissioner of Education, president of Kentucky Wesleyan College, and president of the University of Florida
- Lawrence Walkup, president of Northern Arizona University
