= Pearlie Craft Dove =

African American college professor

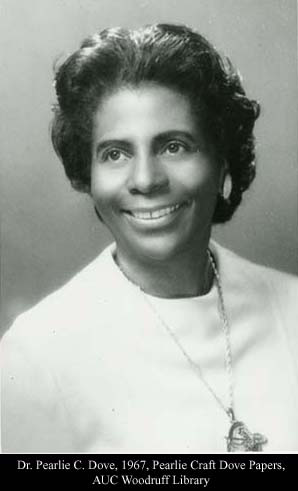
- Pearlie Craft Dove, 1967
- Born: Pearlie Mae Craft; 1920; Atlanta, Georgia, U.S.
- Died: August 18, 2015 (aged 94–95); Atlanta, Georgia, U.S.
- Occupations: Educator, philanthropist
- Spouse: Reverend Jackson B. Dove
- Children: Carol Ann Dove Kotcha (daughter)
- Parents: Dan Cecile Craft (father); Lizzie Dyer (mother)

Pearlie Craft Dove (born Pearlie Mae Craft; 1920 – August 18, 2015) was an African-American educator. Dove taught at Clark College and helped to improve the college's Education Department. Under her leadership, Clark College became the first private Historically Black College in Georgia to be accredited by the National Council for Accreditation of Teacher Education. Later, she aided in the consolidation of Clark College with Atlanta University in order to begin Clark Atlanta University. She was also elected to work at the policy making level of the Association of Teacher Educators (AATE) and the American Association of Colleges for Teacher Education (AACTE).

In addition, Dove served on many service committees and headed projects of her own in order to uplift the West End community. Dove's community service efforts were centered on the arts, education, historical preservation, oral history, and public safety. In August 2015, Dove died in her home in the community that she served and taught in throughout her life.

== Early life ==
Pearlie Craft Dove was born in Atlanta, Georgia, in 1920 to Lizzie Dyer and Dan Cecile Craft. Dove's mother moved her family into the West End of Atlanta so that Dove could grow up around social and educational activity. Dove's father was shell-shocked in World War I, and was ill during most of her life until he passed during her childhood. His illness and death can be attributed to the poor treatment of black veterans during this time. However, while he was alive. Dan Cecile Craft was an advocate and black pride and entrepreneurship, which Craft carried with her. Dove's grandfather, Caleb "Bud" Dyer, also influenced her heavily. He taught her about discipline and etiquette. Despite receiving a 3rd-grade-level education, he emphasized the importance of knowledge and education and taught Dove that ignorance was not acceptable. He was also a man of strong Christian values and introduced her into the church that she would be a part of for the rest of her life.

During her childhood, in an era of segregation, Craft anticipated attended a local school only to discover on her first day that it had been burned down by white people who were upset that the school give to black students. This experience furthered the importance of education and community activism for Dove.

== Personal life ==
In the early 1940s, Dove married Army chaplain Jackson B. Dove. Pearlie and Jackson Dove had a daughter who died during infancy. They went on to have another daughter named Carol Ann Dove. Chaplain Jackson B. Dove died in 1952 in a car crash.

== Education ==
Dove graduated from Booker T. Washington High School (Atlanta, Georgia) in 1937. Upon graduating, Dove received a scholarship to attend Clark College and graduated with a Bachelor of Arts in 1941. She double majored in Home Economics and Education. While at Clark College, she was the Literary Editor of The Mentor, Clark College's magazine, a member of Delta Sigma Theta sorority, and her senior class Vice President. Additionally, Dove graduated cum laude.

Dove went on to attend Atlanta University and receive her master's degree in Elementary Education in 1943. Finally, in 1959, Dove received her Doctorate in Supervision and Education of Teachers from University of Colorado Boulder. During her life, Dove was a part of Pi Lambda Theta, Kappa Delta Epsilon, and Phi Delta Kappa honor societies.

== Philanthropy ==
=== Clark College ===
Much of Dove's life and career was centered on her alma mater, Clark College. The title of Dove's dissertation was "A Study of the Relationship of Certain Criteria and Success in Student Teaching Program at Clark College". While writing this dissertation, she also developed the Clark College Student Teaching Program. Later Dove also conducted a Self-study of Clark College, which she published in 1968. The study was conducted between 1966 and 1968 and was prepared by the committee of the faculty for the Southern Association of Colleges and Schools (SACS),.

After receiving her master's degree, Dove returned to be an instructor in the Department of Education and Psychology at Clark College. While instructing, she also served as the Director of Student Teaching from 1949 to 1963 and the Chairwoman of the Department of Education. Dove taught at Clark College from 1949 until her retirement in 1987. Upon retirement, she helped to merge Clark College and Atlanta University into Clark Atlanta University as the Associate Chair on the Consolidation Steering Committee from 1988 to 1990. She continued to have a relationship with the new university, and was appointed "Professor Emeritus" by Clark Atlanta University in 1993. She also served on the advisory council for the Clark Atlanta University Service Learning Center beginning in 1997.

While teaching at Clark College, Dove received the Clark College Alumni Award for Outstanding Services as a Faculty Member for the 1981–1982 school year. She was the Selected Teacher Worthy of Emulation by Education Students in 1984 and she received the Leadership Award at the Clark College Faculty Assembly in 1986. Upon retirement in 1988, she also received the Clark College Distinguished Alumni Achievement Award and "The Clark College Curriculum Laboratory" was changed to "The Pearlie Craft Dove Curriculum Resource Center".

=== Big Bethel African Methodist Episcopal Church ===
Dove not only had a passion for education, but also community service. Dove was a very active member of her church, Big Bethel AME Church. Upon graduation from college, Dove was a Sunday school teacher and a member of the choir. She also served on the Steering Committee of the Junior Church and was a member of the Progressive Board and Daughters of Bethel. She also helped to write and publish a history of the church. Published in 1968, the history was entitled "Big Bethel African Methodist Episcopal Church: A Century of Progress and Christian Service".

Dove was honored with the Lay Fellowship Award in 1987. She also served as the co-chair of the Historic Preservation Committee in 1983 and a member of the Scholarship Committee in 1998.

=== Additional philanthropy ===
In addition to her work with Clark College, Dove also held many other leadership positions. In 1949, Dove served as Program Director at the Goodwill center in Memphis, Tennessee. Dove also served as the President of the Atlanta Alumnae Chapter of Delta Sigma Theta between 1962 and 1963 and the President of the Atlanta Pan-Hellenic Council from 1961 until 1966.

Dove also served as a Consultant for the Adult Education Committee of the Phyllis Wheatley Branch of YWCA from 1960 until 1976. She also worked closely with the Association of Student Teachers between 1965 and 1969 as the Newsletter Editor, then Vice President and eventually President. In addition, Dove served on the Georgia Teacher Education Council from 1965 to 1982, and was a member of the executive committee from 1965 until 1968. From 1975 until 1981, she also served on the Elementary Commission for the SACS. And, on a national level, Dove served on the Multicultural Commission from 1979 to 1980 and the Commission of Self Governance from 1980 to 1981 for the AATE.

== Community service ==
Dove worked to restore Washington Park, Atlanta and helped to get the park onto the National Register of Historic Places as the Chair of the Social Action Committee of the Washington Park Community Club beginning in 1958 and a Committee member of the Washington Park Historic Committee in 1992. From 1992 until 1996, Dove served as the Cluster Coordinator for The Atlanta Project. The Atlanta Project was an initiative of President Jimmy Carter and the Carter Center. The project attempted to reduce poverty and hopelessness by tapping into the talent that exists in Atlanta and giving communities the tools to tackle social issues. During this time, she instituted an Adult Literacy Program and Established an Adolescent Health Station at Washington High School. She also helped to publish A Gold Mine on the Westside, a photographic documentary, and Neighborhood Portraits: Men and Women who Built and Inspired Our Community, an oral history.

Other service endeavors of Dove include serving as the Chair of the Education Committee Neighborhood Planning Unit and Member Housing Committee from 1993 until 1998. In 1996, Dove served on the Pedestrian Advisory Committee where she helped to pass legislation to ban 16-wheeler trucks from passion through the neighborhood. On this committee, she also helped to get legislation passed to install traffic lights on a corner, which the neighborhood had been trying to accomplish for thirty years. She was also the Pro temp Convener of the Westside Community Advancement Association beginning in 1997. She also helped to publish another oral history project in 1999, called "A Community Based Oral History Project: Vignette of Eleven Residents on Atlanta West Side". The history was published in partnership with the Department of Sociology and Anthropology at Spelman College and the Neighborhood Task Force, on which she served as the Chair of the Historic Committee beginning in 1998.

== Publications ==
Dove has many publications, including "An Exploration of Planned Observation- Participation and Experiences Prior to Student Teaching in Conjunction with Children's Literature", which was published in 1958. Later, in 1971, she published a work with Rebecca Davis called "The Origin, Development, and Implementation of the Clark College Elementary Teacher Education Model". Another collaboration occurred with Ora Hill Cooks in 1982 called "Decreasing Student Enrollment and the Future of Teacher Education". In 2000, she also had her work "Educating Out Children" published in a book entitled What Works with Children: Wisdom and Reflections from People who have Devoted their Careers to Kids. Finally, Dove published a book of her own called Pearls of Wisdom from a Woman of Color, Courage and Commitment: Pearlie Craft Dove in 2015.

== Honors and awards ==
- One of forty black women presented to Kennedy administration as eminently qualified to serve Government in policy making positions by the American Council on Human Rights (1961)
- Delta Sigma Theta sorority Achievement Award, Atlanta Alumni chapter (1960-1963)
- Woman of the Year in Education, Iota Phi Lambda sorority (1962)
- Plaque, Student National Education Association, Clark College (1970)
- Chairman's Award, The State Committee on the Life and History of Black Georgians (1980)
- Distinguished Member, National Association of Teacher Educators (1983)
- Trailblazer Award, Atlanta Public Schools System, Area I (1988)
- Faithful Service Awards, Atlanta University National Alumni Association (1989)
- Delta Torch Award, Atlanta Alumnae chapter, Delta Sigma Theta sorority (1989)
- Featured in Southern Belle's 90-91 Calendar of Atlanta Black History: Black Women Achievers
- Distinguished Alumni Award, National Association for Equal Opportunity in Higher Education (NAFEO) (1992)
- Rosalynn Carter Fellow, Emory University Institute for Women's Studies (1993-1995)
- Golden Glasses Awards Nominee, Atlanta Regional Commission (1997)
