= Ovila Cayer =

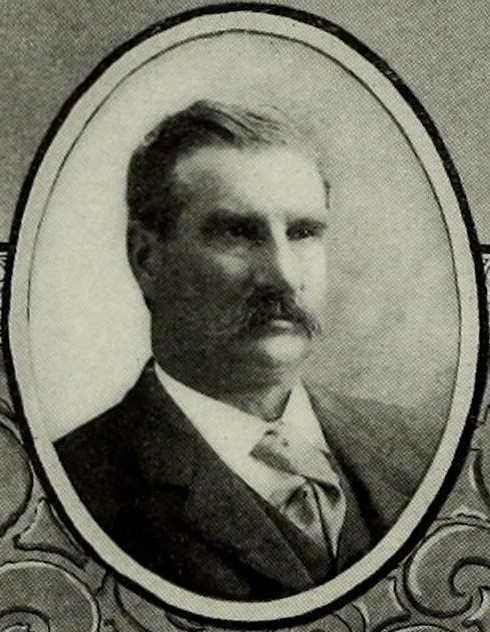
- Born: February 9, 1844; Saint-Rémi, Quebec
- Died: February 7, 1909 (aged 64); Salinas, California
- Burial place: Garden of Memories Memorial Park, Salinas, California
- Military career
- Allegiance: United States of America; Union
- Branch: United States Army; Union Army
- Service years: 1861–1867
- Rank: Sergeant
- Nickname: Frenchy
- Unit: 14th Regiment U.S. Infantry
- Conflicts: American Civil War • Battle of Fredericksburg • Battle of Gettysburg • Battle of the Wilderness • Battle of Globe Tavern
- Awards: Medal of Honor

Ovila "Frenchy" Cayer (February 9, 1844 – February 7, 1909) was a Union Army soldier in the American Civil War and a recipient of the United States military's highest decoration, the Medal of Honor, for his actions at the Battle of Globe Tavern.

== Biography ==
Born in Saint-Rémi, Canada East (present-day Quebec), Cayer immigrated to the Malone, New York, where he was known by the nickname "Frenchy". By the time of his enlistment in the U.S. Army in August 1861, his only surviving family was a brother living in New York. During the war, he served as a sergeant in Company A of the 14th Infantry Regiment. At the Battle of Fredericksburg in December 1862, he was captured but later was released and rejoined his unit. On the second day of the Battle of Gettysburg, July 2, 1863, when his company was devastated by a Confederate cavalry attack, Cayer picked up a flag from a dead color bearer and rallied the troops. He was wounded in May of the next year at the Battle of the Wilderness.

On August 19, 1864, Cayer participated in the Battle of Globe Tavern near Petersburg, Virginia. After assaulting and capturing a railroad junction used by the Confederates to supply the besieged city of Petersburg, his unit prepared for an expected counterattack. When the attack came, all of the officers in Company A were killed or wounded. Cayer took command of the company and led it in the successful defense of their position. For these actions, he was awarded the Medal of Honor three years later, on February 15, 1867. His official Medal of Honor citation reads simply: "Commanded the regiment, all the officers being disabled."

Cayer remained in the Army for two years after the end of the war until being discharged at Fort Yuma in February 1867. He traveled to northern California, first living in San Francisco, and then working as a farmer in Alameda County and later Stanislaus County. He eventually settled in Salinas, where he was a foreman at Spence Ranch (later owned by Spreckels Sugar Company) and operated a cigar store. He was active in many civic and fraternal organizations in Salinas, including the Freemasons.

Admitted to Jim Bardin Hospital with intestinal trouble in February 1909, Cayer seemed to be making a recovery until his sudden death on February 7. He was buried at Garden of Memories Memorial Park in Salinas. On September 22, 2005, his grave marker was modified to add the words "Medal of Honor"; the headstone had previously made no mention of his military service.

== See also ==
- List of American Civil War Medal of Honor recipients: A–F
