= Lowell Frazer =

Dr. Lowell K. (Jim) Frazer was a mathematician who worked for the National Security Agency (NSA) in the field of cryptography.

Dr. Lowell K. (Jim) Frazer, 2003

"Dr. Lowell K. ("Jim") Frazer founded modern cryptographic evaluation for the US government. As a result of his efforts, all cryptography used for classified applications by the U.S. Department of Defense and Intelligence Community is now subject to rigorous scientific evaluation. He influenced the design of most U.S. cryptographic systems fielded prior to 1990. In addition, Dr. Frazer was a prolific writer of technical papers.

He was selected as the first Communications Security (COMSEC) mathematician assigned as an integrated member at GCHQ from 1954 to 1956. During this two-year tour, he performed assessments of many cryptographic systems, designed speech cryptosystems, and discovered an analytic technique that would be widely used over the next three decades. Also, he authored a training primer for new COMSEC cryptomathematicians.

Dr. Frazer was the principal formulator of the standards that the United States and the United Kingdom use to judge the strength of cryptographic systems. He continued to lead the adaptation and extension of those standards as the role of cryptography grew from COMSEC to a more diverse mission.

Under his leadership, the industrial TEMPEST program, a novel approach to government-industry interaction, matured. The program integrated TEMPEST concerns into the security evaluation process for U.S. cryptographic equipment.

Dr. Frazer played a major role in developing NSA’s mathematics, cryptanalysis and Information Assurance (IA) communities. He assisted in developing the National Cryptologic School and was associated with the CryptoMath Institute from its inception. He was a member of the Mathematics, Cryptanalysis, and COMSEC Career Panels, and an Advisor to the NSA Technical Journal for approximately 20 years.

Dr. Frazer received numerous awards throughout his career including the Agency’s Meritorious Civilian Service Award in 1969, the Exceptional Civilian Service Award in 1981, and the DCI’s National Intelligence Distinguished Service Medal in 1985."

In 2003 he was inducted in the NSA's Hall of Honor, an honor reserved for those who have made significant long-term contributions to cryptographic science.

Following his retirement in 1985, Dr. Frazer started Information Security Systems Inc. to provide information assurance consulting services. For the next 20 years he was active in advancing the technology of information assurance for clients with unusually high levels of risk.

Dr. Lowell K. (Jim) Frazer died at age 88 on 18 December 2013. He was buried, with full military honors, at Arlington National Cemetery on 20 March 2014.
