= Cecily Giles =

Scottish university administrator and Bletchley Park veteran (1922–2020)

Cecilia Giles
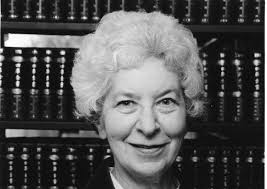
- Born: Cecilia Elspeth Giles; 18 September 1922; Dumfries, Scotland
- Died: 19 April 2020 (aged 97); Edinburgh, Scotland
- Education: University of Edinburgh
- Occupations: codebreaker university administrator
- Employer: University of Edinburgh

Cecilia Elspeth Giles CBE (18 September 1922 – 19 April 2020) was a Scottish university administrator and a Bletchley Park veteran.

== Life ==
Giles was born in Dumfries, Scotland to Dr and Mrs Falconer Giles. Her father was a Reader in Ancient Greek and Roman history. She attended St Trinnean's girls' school before going on to Queen Margaret's, Scarborough. She liked this school and remained in the old pupils' association serving as an honorary vice president.

She studied history at the University of Edinburgh, and while at university was invited to attend an interview for an unspecified job. The interview was in London and there she learned that she was being recruited to work at Bletchley Park. She was interviewed by the Director of Military Intelligence. Ailsa Maxwell, a fellow student at the University of Edinburgh, accepted a similar offer.

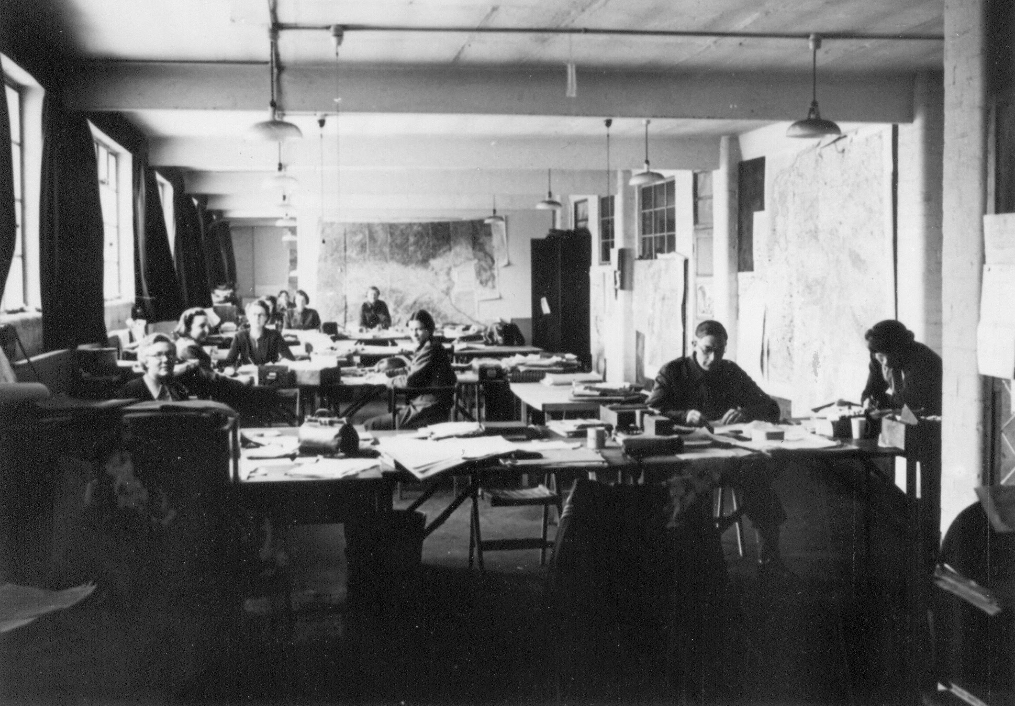
The SIXTA team at Bletchley Park - names unknown

Giles was enrolled in a unit of the Auxiliary Territorial Service attached to the Intelligence Corps. She took a six-week course studying cryptography and the Enigma Machine, coming top of her class. She worked in the ATS Military Section SIXTA analysing messages that cryptographers had cracked. Having signed the Official Secrets Act, she never discussed her war time activities.

At the end of the war she was moved to Eastcote in London where GCHQ was being formed. The new unit consisted of experienced codebreakers like herself who had worked in the United Kingdom, and others returning from the front. She left in 1946 and went back to work at the University of Edinburgh. She visited her brother in Africa and was then based at Khartoum University for an academic year helping with administration. She returned to the University of Edinburgh where she spent the remainder of her career organising their administration.

In 2017 she was an Honorary Vice-President of her Edinburgh University Students' Association.

Giles died in Edinburgh in 2020 at the age of 97.
