= Kappa Delta Epsilon =

American professional education fraternity

- ΚΔΕ
- Founded: March 25, 1933; 93 years ago Washington, D.C.
- Type: Professional
- Affiliation: Independent
- Former affiliation: PFA; PPA
- Status: Active
- Emphasis: Education
- Scope: National
- Motto: "Logos"
- Colors: Purple and White
- Flower: Purple iris
- Publication: The ΚΔΕ Current
- Chapters: 16 Undergraduate, 5 Alumni
- Headquarters: c/o Dr. J. Elizabeth Casey; Texas A&M University–Central Texas; 1001 Leadership Place; Kileen, Texas 76549; United States
- Website: sites.google.com/view/kappadeltaepsilon/home/

Kappa Delta Epsilon (ΚΔΕ) is a professional fraternity for students in education. It was organized in 1933 as a sister organization to Kappa Phi Kappa, a men's educational fraternity.

== History ==
On March 25, 1933, at the invitation of the executive council of Kappa Phi Kappa, professional educational fraternity representatives from six institutions met in Washington, D.C. and formed a national honorary professional education organization for women. The movement was sponsored by the following national officers of Kappa Phi Kappa: Dean Will Grant Chambers of Pennsylvania State College, Professor Fredrick Henke of Allegheny College, and Dr. Arthur Wright. Thus, Kappa Phi Epsilon was formed as a sister sorority to Kappa Phi Kappa.

Kappa Phi Epsilon was established with six chapters in 1933, including Alpha at Allegheny College, Beta at Birmingham-Southern College, Gamma at Cornell University, Delta as the Atlanta Area Alumni chapter, Epsilon at Illinois State University, and Zeta at Temple University. The founding delegates for the new professional women's sorority were Mrs. W. W. Cottman of Temple University, Olive Miller Ellis of Cornell University, Eoline Wallace Moore of Birmingham–Southern College, Mina French Mosher of Allegheny College, Dorothy Orr of Emory University, Sylvia Levitt Ostrow of Temple University, Mrs. Claudius Layton Taylor of Emory University, and Mary D. Webb of Illinois State University.

Kappa Delta Epsilon holds a biennial convention where its national executive board and national executive council are elected. The organization was incorporated in the State of Georgia in 1935. The sorority published the first issue of its magazine, The Circle of Kappa Delta Epsilon in 1935. In 1947, The Circle was replaced with The Kappa Delta Epsilon Current.

Kappa Delta Epsilon joined the Professional Panhellenic Association in 1953. By 1963, the sorority initiated 5,213 members had had 38 active collegiate chapters and five alumnae chapters. In 1978, Kappa Delta Epsilon was a charter member of the Professional Fraternity Association. That same year, it was changed from a sorority to a society, and men were allowed to join.

== Symbols ==
Kappa Delta Epsilon's key is shield-shaped with the word Λογος (Logos) at the top and the Greek letters ΚΔΕ on a scroll that is across the shield.

The motto of Kappa Delta Epsilon is "Logos". Its colors are purple and white. Its flower is the purple iris. Its publication is The Current.

== Membership ==
Membership in Kappa Delta Epsilon is open to men and women who are education majors and have completed thirty credit hours. Undergraduates must have at least a 3.0 GPA and graduate students must have at least a 3.5 GPA.

Membership categories include collegiate, alumni, honorary, and members-at-large.

== Chapters ==
As of 2025, Kappa Delta Epsilon has sixteen undergraduate chapters and five alumni chapters.

== Notable members ==
- Pearlie Craft Dove, professor of education at Clark College
- Eleanor P. Sheppard, Mayor of Richmond, Virginia and member of the Virginia House of Delegates

== See also ==
- Professional fraternities and sororities
- Kappa Phi Kappa
