= Consuelo Milner =

American cryptograher and engineer (1927–2020)

Consuelo "Connie" Stokes Milner (May 30, 1927 – September 4, 2020) was an American engineer, cryptographer, and educator.

== Early life ==
Milner originally worked in dress design before going into engineering. She was a member of Phi Delta Kappa, education honor society.

== Scientific career ==
Milner worked as an electrical engineer at the Brooklyn Navy Yard at the GS-12 level. She received this promotion after 10 years of service. Milner was the first woman to hold that high of a position ever. Her work was considered to be classified. Milner's work also included Cryptography for the Naval Applied Science Lab.

== Patent ==
Milner held a US patent for thermally stabilized crystal units. This was a method for producing electricity.

== Later career ==
Milner later became a mathematics teacher.
