= Theresa Chapple =

American epidemiologist

- Education: University of Illinois at Chicago; Clark Atlanta University; University of North Carolina at Chapel Hill
- Scientific career
- Workplaces: Health Resources and Services Administration
- Thesis: Effects of interpregnancy intervals immediately following a fetal death on maternal and perinatal health (2009)

Theresa Chapple is an American epidemiologist who was the Health Director for Oak Park, Illinois. Her research considers health disparities and the health of underserved populations. She led the Oak Park village response to the COVID-19, for which she was voted "Oak Parker of the Year".

== Early life and education ==
Chapple earned a bachelor's degree in psychology at Clark Atlanta University. She moved to the University of North Carolina at Chapel Hill for graduate studies, focused on public health. Chapple was a doctoral researcher at the University of Illinois Chicago. Her research considers maternal mortality and the identification of strategies to prevent Black women from dying during childbirth. After graduating, she joined the Health Resources and Services Administration as a health researcher.

== Career ==
Chapple worked on public health at the Shelby County Health Department during the 2009 swine flu pandemic. She moved to the Georgia Department of Public Health to help tackle the 2015–16 Zika virus epidemic. Influenza A virus subtype H1N1 (swine flu) and Zika virus both disproportionately impacted pregnant women and children.

During the COVID-19 pandemic, Chapple became concerned about outbreaks amongst children in schools, summer camps and daycares. She maintained an up-to-date list of outbreaks on Twitter, and called on the Centers for Disease Control and Prevention to identify safe strategies to re-open schools. She provided commentary to the media on public health protocols and the safety of vaccines. In 2021, she was made responsible for public health in Oak Park. She developed safety protocols and strategies to protect her communities from COVID-19. This included running vaccine clinics for young children in the Oak Park Elementary School District and implementing quarantine policies for COVID positive school children. Over the summer, Chapple created a moving health van, which took vaccines, facts and information to communities around the district.

In November 2021, members of the Oak Park community campaigned to keep Chapple in the post as their public health chief. Her efforts to protect the Oak Park School District were honored with a certificate in December 2021. She was named Oak Park Villager of the Year in 2022, by the local weekly newspaper.
