= Mary Frances Early =

First African American graduate of University of Georgia

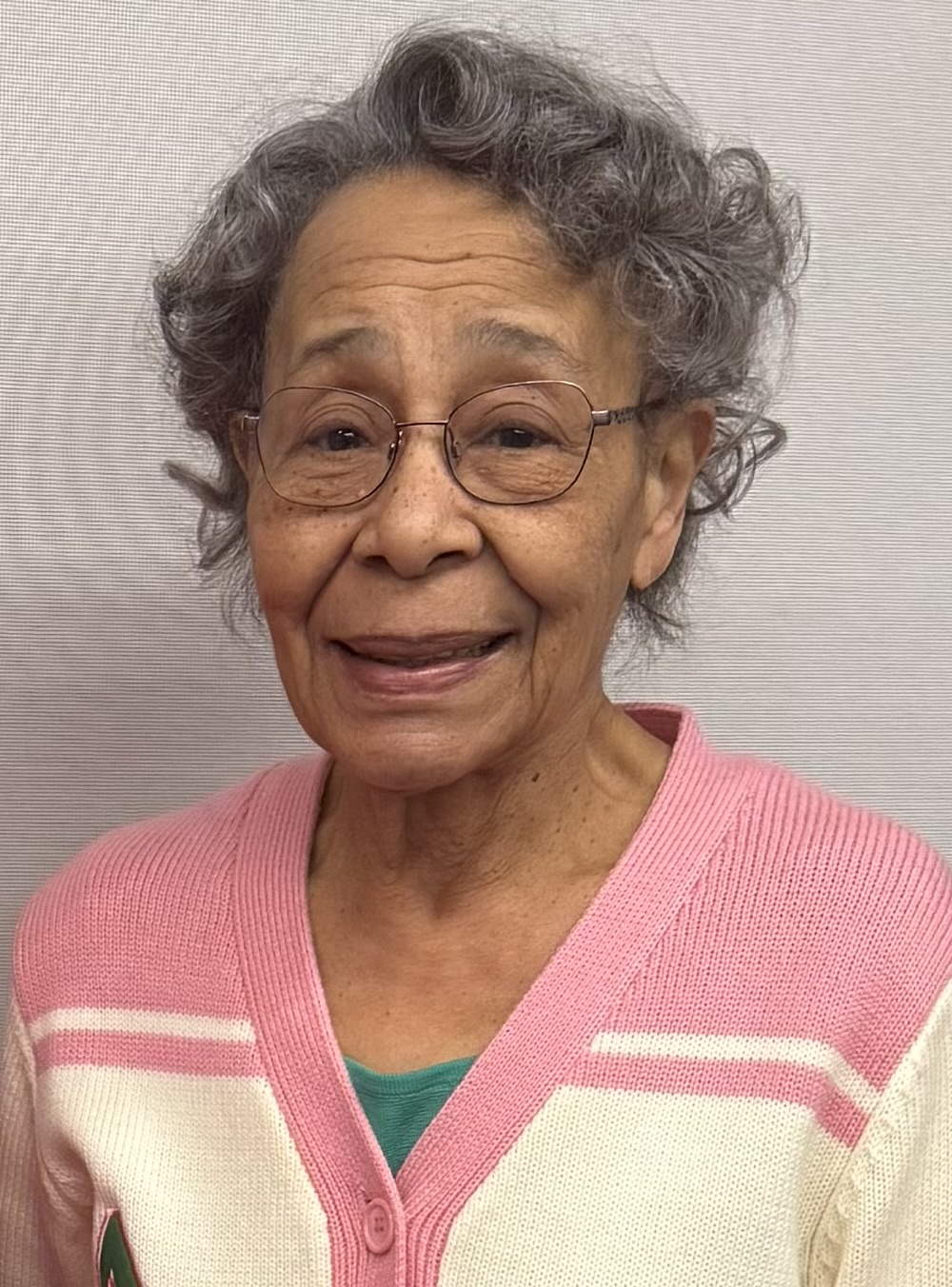
- Early in 2026
- Born: June 14, 1936 (age 90); Atlanta, Georgia
- Education: University of Georgia (1962, M.M.Ed.); University of Georgia (1967, Ed.S.)
- Occupation: Teacher
- Known for: First Black person to receive a degree from the University of Georgia

Mary Frances Early (born June 14, 1936) is an American educator who was the first African-American to earn a degree from the University of Georgia. Early graduated with a master's degree in music education in 1962, and later received an educational specialist degree in 1967.

== Early years and education ==
Early was born on June 14, 1936, in Atlanta, Georgia to John H. and Ruth Early. She attended Turner High School there and went on to graduate from Clark College (later Clark Atlanta University) with a bachelor's degree in music education in 1957. She began her postgraduate work at the University of Michigan to pursue a master's degree in music education then enrolled at the University of Georgia in 1961, receiving her master's degree (MMEd) in music education on August 16, 1962. She also earned an Ed.S. degree in music education in 1967 from Georgia.

== Career ==
During Early's career, she spent time as a music teacher, a planning and development co-ordinator, an elementary division curriculum specialist and a music resource teacher at various schools, including John Hope Elementary, Wesley Avenue Elementary Schools and Coan Middle School. In addition, she was an adjunct professor at Morehouse and Spelman Colleges a music co-ordinator and supervisor of Atlanta Public Schools. She was the first African-American Georgia Music Educators Association president in 1981. In 2003, Early was the head of the music department at Clark Atlanta University.

== Recognition ==
Early's awards include the STAR Teacher Award from Coan Middle School (1972), the Benjamin E. Mays Black Music Heritage Award (1995), the University of Georgia Outstanding Alumna Award (2000) and the Foot Soldier for Equal Justice (University of Georgia) Award. In light of this attention, she said, "It wasn't in our vocabulary to think that people were good or bad because of their skin color, so I was just sort of taken aback that it became a big issue later in my life." On May 10, 2013, at the Spring Commencement Ceremony, Early was honored by the University of Georgia when President Michael F. Adams presented her with an honorary doctorate of laws degree. Early's honorary doctorate is only the 79th honorary doctoral degree conferred in UGA's history. In 2019, the Board of Regents of the University System of Georgia approved naming the UGA College of Education in her honor. The UGA College of Education was officially named the Mary Frances Early College of Education in February of 2020.

In the fall 2005 issue of the Graduate School Magazine, Cynthia Adams profiled Early as a "They Were First" subject under the title, "Mary Frances Early Speaks: on a public education and the dynamics of change". She was also included as a profile (pp 65–70) in the 2010 commemorative book, Centennial: Graduate Education at the University of Georgia 1910-2010, which was published by the University of Georgia Graduate School (2010) and written by Cynthia Adams. UGA President Jere Morehead presented Early with a presidential medal in 2018.
