= Frenchy Jolene Hodges =

American educator, writer (born 1940)

- Born: October 18, 1940 (age 85); Dublin, Georgia, U.S.
- Education: Fort Valley State College (B.S.); Atlanta University (M.A.)
- Occupations: Teacher, author
- Children: 2

Frenchy Jolene Hodges (born 1940) is an American educator, and author of poetry and short fiction.

== Life and career ==
Frenchy Jolene Hodges was born on October 18, 1940 in Dublin, Georgia. She earned her Bachelor of Science in 1964 from Fort Valley State College. In 1972, she received a fellowship to study in the Afro-American Studies master's program at Atlanta University.

Hodges began her career in Detroit, where she taught English and creative writing, beginning in 1966. She also acted on stage for a brief period. In 1971, she worked with Broadside Press to publish her first chapbook, Black Wisdom. The following year, she moved to Atlanta, where she worked for Atlanta Public Schools until retiring before 2003. In 1979, Ms. Magazine published her short story, "Requiem for Willie Lee," which has been reprinted and included in anthologies of African-American women writers.

In 2003, she returned to Buckeye, near Dublin, Georgia. She co-founded Legacy Readers Theatre in 2008.

Hodges has twin children, born in the late 1970s.

== Books ==
- Black Wisdom. Broadside Press. 1971. ISBN 978-0-910-29640-3.
- Piece de Way Home. Tibi Productions. 1975.
- For My Guy. Tibi Productions. 1975.
- The Man of the House Is Not at Home and Other Poems. Little Odyssey Press. 1985.
- Ubuntu: Ubuntu, I am because we are. CreateSpace Independent Publishing Platform. 2016. ISBN 978-1-541-02644-5.
