= Ibn al-Durayhim =

ʿAlī ibn Muḥammad ibn ʿAbd al-ʿAzīz Ibn Futūḥ ibn Ibrahīm ibn Abū Bakr (Arabic: علي بن محمد بن عبد العزيز بن فتوح بن ابراهيم بن أبي بكر; 1312–1359/62 CE), known as Ibn Durayhim al-Mawsilī (Arabic: ابن الدريهم الموصلي) was an Arab writer, mathematician, cryptologist and scribe.

== Cryptology ==
Ibn al-Durayhim gave detailed descriptions of eight cipher systems that discussed substitution ciphers, leading to the earliest suggestion of a "tableau" of the kind that two centuries later became known as the "Vigenère table".

His book entitled Clear Chapters Goals and Solving Ciphers (مقاصد الفصول المترجمة عن حل الترجمة) was recently discovered, but has yet to be published. It includes the use of the statistical techniques pioneered by Al-Kindi and Ibn 'Adlan.

== The Book on the Usefulness of Animals ==
In the year 1355 CE, Ibn al-Durayhim compiled the Book on the Usefulness of Animals (Arabic: كتاب منافع الحيوان). The work draws largely on the work of Ibn Bakhtīshūʿ and Aristotle. The manuscript is now housed in the Escorial Library (Ar.898). The text contains 91 illustrations of various animals.
