= Lawrence L. Larmore =

American mathematician

- Citizenship: United States
- Education: Northwestern University; University of California, Irvine
- Known for: competitive analysis, topology, and Monte Carlo algorithm.
- Scientific career
- Fields: Theoretical computer science Algebraic topology
- Workplaces: University of Nevada, Las Vegas (UNLV); University of Bonn; Institute for Advanced Study

Lawrence L. Larmore is an American mathematician and theoretical computer scientist. Since 1994 he has been a professor of computer science at the University of Nevada, Las Vegas (UNLV). Larmore developed the package-merge algorithm for the length-limited Huffman coding problem, as well as an algorithm for optimizing paragraph breaking in linear time. He is perhaps best known for his work with competitive analysis of online algorithms, particularly for the k-server problem. His contributions, with his co-author Marek Chrobak, led to the application of T-theory to the server problem.

Larmore earned a Ph.D. in Mathematics in the field of algebraic topology from Northwestern University in 1965. He later earned a second Ph.D., this time in Computer Science, in the field of theoretical computer science from University of California, Irvine. He is a past member of Institute for Advanced Study in Princeton, New Jersey and Gastwissenschaftler (visiting scholar) at the University of Bonn.

== Awards ==
- NSF graduate fellowship (1961)
