= Competitive analysis =

Competitive analysis may refer to:

- Competitor analysis
- Competitive analysis (online algorithm)
