= Barbara Hammer (disambiguation) =

Barbara Hammer may refer to:

- Barbara Hammer (1939–2019), American feminist film director, producer, writer, and cinematographer
- Barbara Hammer (computer scientist) (born 1970), German professor of computer science
- Barbara Avedon (née Barbara Hammer, 1930–1994), American television writer, political activist, and feminist
