= Grossberg network =

Grossberg network is an artificial neural network introduced by Stephen Grossberg. It is a self organizing, competitive network based on continuous time. Grossberg, a neuroscientist and a biomedical engineer, designed this network based on the human visual system.

== Shunting model ==
The shunting model is one of Grossberg's neural network models, based on a Leaky integrator, described by the differential equation

$${dn\over dt} \; = \; -An \; + (B - n)E \; - (C + n)I$$,

where $n=n(t)$ represents the activation level of a neuron, $E=E(t)$ and $I=I(t)$ represent the excitatory and inhibitory inputs to the neuron, and $A$, $B$, and $C$ are constants representing the leaky decay rate and the maximum and minimum activation levels.

At equilibrium (where $dn/dt=0$), the activation $n$ reaches the value

$$n \; = \; {BE-CI\over A+E+I}$$.
