= Offline learning =

Machine learning from a fixed dataset

Offline learning is a machine learning training approach in which a model is trained on a fixed dataset that is not updated during the learning process. This dataset is collected beforehand, and the learning typically occurs in a batch mode (i.e., the model is updated using batches of data, rather than a single input-output pair at a time). Once the model is trained, it can make predictions on new, unseen data.

In online learning, only the set of possible elements is known, whereas in offline learning, the learner also knows the order in which they are presented.

== See also ==
- Online machine learning
- Incremental learning
