= Barbara Hammer (computer scientist) =

German computer scientist

Barbara Hammer (born 1970) is a German computer scientist specializing in machine learning including recursive neural networks, incremental learning, and concept drift. She is professor for machine learning in the Center for Cognitive Interaction Technology (CITEC) and Faculty of Technology of Bielefeld University, where she heads the Machine Learning Group (HammerLab).

== Education and career ==
Hammer completed a diploma (the German equivalent of a master's degree) in mathematics in 1995 at Osnabrück University. Continuing at Osnabrück University in computer science, she completed a Ph.D. in 1999 with the dissertation Learning with recurrent neural networks supervised by Volker Sperschneider. She received a habilitation at Osnabrück in 2003.

From 2004 to 2010, Hammer was a professor of theoretical computer science at the Clausthal University of Technology. She became a professor of theoretical computer science at Bielefeld University in 2010, and professor and chair for machine learning in 2017.

== Recognition ==
Hammer was elected to Academia Europaea in 2024.
