= Adversary model =

Concept in computer science

In computer science, an online algorithm measures its competitiveness against different adversary models. For deterministic algorithms, the adversary is the same as the adaptive offline adversary. For randomized online algorithms competitiveness can depend upon the adversary model used.

== Common adversaries ==
The three common adversaries are the oblivious adversary, the adaptive online adversary, and the adaptive offline adversary.

The oblivious adversary is sometimes referred to as the weak adversary. This adversary knows the algorithm's code, but does not get to know the randomized results of the algorithm.

The adaptive online adversary is sometimes called the medium adversary. This adversary must make its own decision before it is allowed to know the decision of the algorithm.

The adaptive offline adversary is sometimes called the strong adversary. This adversary knows everything, even the random number generator. This adversary is so strong that randomization does not help against it.

== Important results ==
From S. Ben-David, A. Borodin, R. Karp, G. Tardos, A. Wigderson we have:

- If there is a randomized algorithm that is α-competitive against any adaptive offline adversary then there also exists an α-competitive deterministic algorithm.
- If G is a c-competitive randomized algorithm against any adaptive online adversary, and there is a randomized d-competitive algorithm against any oblivious adversary, then G is a randomized (c * d)-competitive algorithm against any adaptive offline adversary.

== See also ==
- Competitive analysis (online algorithm)
- K-server problem
- Online algorithm
