= Gail Carpenter =

American cognitive scientist, neuroscientist and mathematician

Gail Alexandra Carpenter
- Education: University of Wisconsin–Madison; University of Colorado Boulder
- Known for: Adaptive Resonance Theory (ART), neural network models and applications
- Spouse(s): Stephen Grossberg (m. 1979–)
- Awards: IEEE Neural Networks Pioneer (2008)
- Scientific career
- Fields: Mathematics, Neuroscience
- Workplaces: Boston University, Northeastern University, MIT
- Thesis: Traveling wave solutions of nerve impulse equations
- Academic advisors: Charles C. Conley

Gail Alexandra Carpenter is an American cognitive scientist, neuroscientist and mathematician, known for her work with Stephen Grossberg developing adaptive resonance theory, a theory of how the human brain processes information, and for her work on the Hodgkin–Huxley model of how neurons operate.

She is a professor emerita of mathematics and statistics at Boston University, where she was also a professor of cognitive and neural systems.

== Education and career ==
Carpenter attended the International School of Geneva then went to the University of Colorado. She completed her Ph.D. in mathematics in 1975 at the University of Wisconsin–Madison, with the dissertation Traveling Wave Solutions of Nerve Impulse Equations supervised by Charles C. Conley.

Carpenter was a faculty member at the Massachusetts Institute of Technology and at Northeastern University before joining Boston University.

== Recognition ==
Carpenter was the first woman to receive the Institute of Electrical and Electronics Engineers (IEEE) Neural Networks Pioneer Award in 2008. She received the International Neural Network Society (INNS) Gabor Award in 1999.

She is a Fellow of the INNS, and was named as an IEEE Fellow in 2013.

== Personal life ==
Carpenter married Stephen Grossberg in 1979.

== Selected publications ==
- Carpenter, G. A. (2019). Looking to the future: Learning from experience, averting catastrophe. Neural Networks.
- Carpenter, G. A., & Grossberg, S. (1987). A massively parallel architecture for a self-organizing neural pattern recognition machine. Computer Vision, Graphics and Image Processing, 37(1), 54–115. https://doi.org/10.1016/S0734-189X(87)80014-2
- Carpenter, G. A., Grossberg, S., Markuzon, N., Reynolds, J. H., & Rosen, D. B. (1992). Fuzzy ARTMAP: A Neural Network Architecture for Incremental Supervised Learning of Analog Multidimensional Maps. IEEE Transactions on Neural Networks, 3(5), 698–713. https://doi.org/10.1109/72.159059
- Carpenter, G. A., Grossberg, S., & Reynolds, J. H. (1991). ARTMAP: Supervised real-time learning and classification of nonstationary data by a self-organizing neural network. Neural Networks, 4(5), 565–588. https://doi.org/10.1016/0893-6080(91)90012-T
- Carpenter, G. A., Grossberg, S., & Rosen, D. B. (1991). Fuzzy ART: Fast stable learning and categorization of analog patterns by an adaptive resonance system. Neural Networks, 4(6), 759–771. https://doi.org/10.1016/0893-6080(91)90056-B
