= Stephen Grossberg =

American scientist (born 1939)

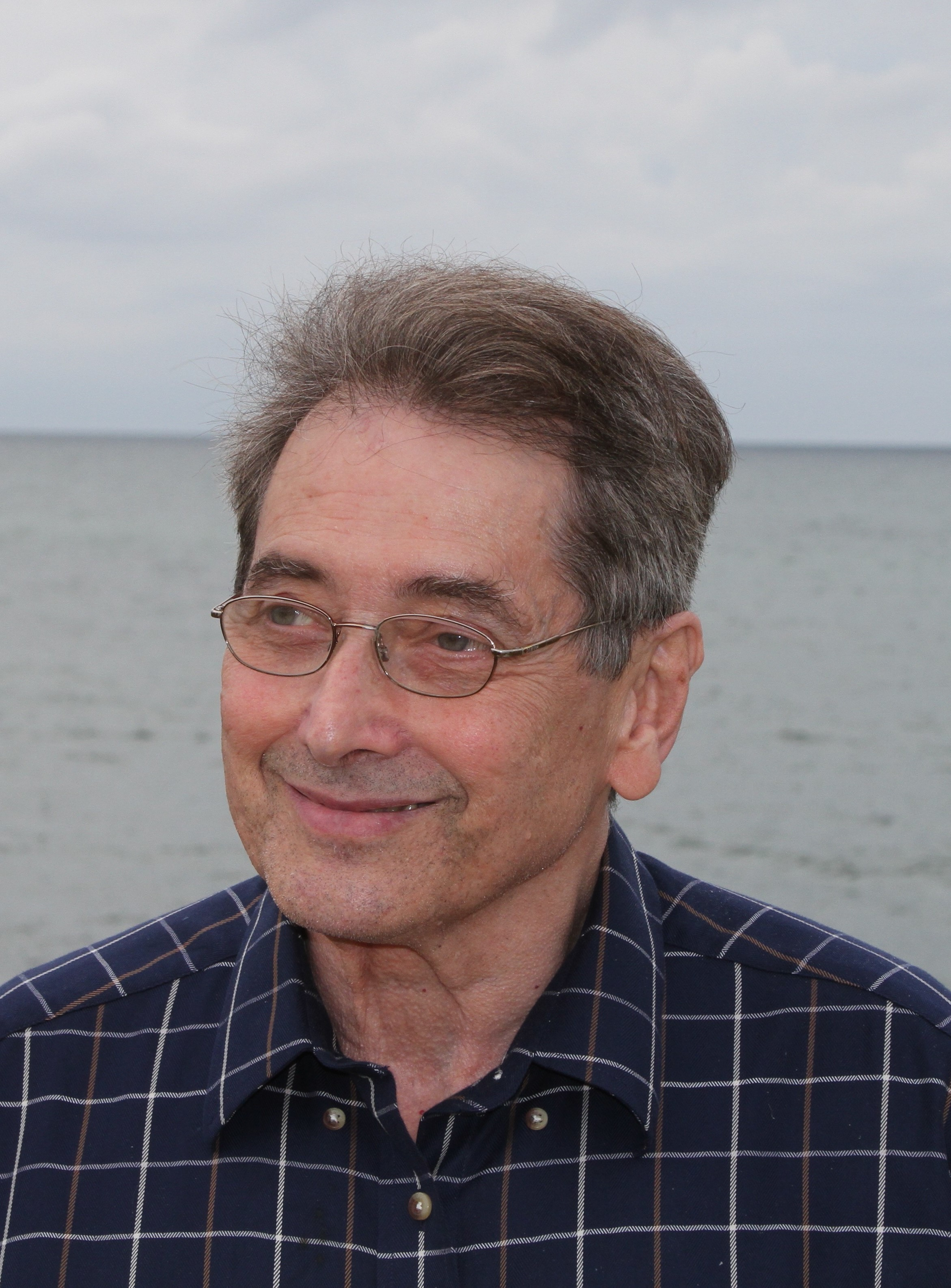
- Grossberg in July, 2016
- Born: 31 December 1939 (age 86); New York City, New York

Stephen Grossberg (born December 31, 1939) is a cognitive scientist, theoretical and computational psychologist, neuroscientist, mathematician, biomedical engineer, and neuromorphic technologist. He is the Wang Professor of Cognitive and Neural Systems and a professor emeritus of Mathematics & Statistics, Psychological & Brain Sciences, and Biomedical Engineering at Boston University.

== Career ==
=== Early life and education ===
Grossberg first lived in Woodside, Queens, in New York City. His father died from Hodgkin's lymphoma when he was one year old. His mother remarried when he was five years old. He then moved with his mother, stepfather, and older brother, Mitchell, to Jackson Heights, Queens. He attended Stuyvesant High School in lower Manhattan after passing its competitive entrance exam. He graduated first in his class from Stuyvesant in 1957.

He began undergraduate studies at Dartmouth College in 1957, where he first conceived of the paradigm of using nonlinear differential equations to describe neural networks that model brain dynamics, as well as the basic equations that many scientists use for this purpose today. He then continued to study both psychology and neuroscience. He received a B.A. in 1961 from Dartmouth as its first joint major in mathematics and psychology.

Grossberg then went to Stanford University, from which he graduated in 1964 with an MS in mathematics and transferred to The Rockefeller Institute for Medical Research (now The Rockefeller University) in Manhattan. In his first year at Rockefeller, he wrote a 500-page monograph summarizing his discoveries to that time. It is called The Theory of Embedding Fields with Applications to Psychology and Neurophysiology. Grossberg received a PhD in mathematics from Rockefeller in 1967 for a thesis that proved the first global content addressable memory theorems about the neural learning models that he had discovered at Dartmouth. His PhD thesis advisor was Gian-Carlo Rota.

=== Entering academia ===
Grossberg was hired in 1967 as an assistant professor of applied mathematics at MIT following strong recommendations from Mark Kac and Rota. In 1969, Grossberg was promoted to associate professor after publishing a stream of conceptual and mathematical results about many aspects of neural networks, including a series of foundational articles in the Proceedings of the National Academy of Sciences between 1967 and 1971.

Grossberg was hired as a full professor at Boston University in 1975, where he is still on the faculty today. While at Boston University, he founded the Department of Cognitive and Neural Systems, several interdisciplinary research centers, and various international institutions.

== Research ==
Grossberg is a pioneer of the fields of computational neuroscience, connectionist cognitive science, and neuromorphic technology. His work focuses upon the design principles and mechanisms that enable the behavior of individuals, or machines, to adapt autonomously in real time to unexpected environmental challenges. This research has included neural models of vision and image processing; object, scene, and event learning, pattern recognition, and search; audition, speech and language; cognitive information processing and planning; reinforcement learning and cognitive-emotional interactions; autonomous navigation; adaptive sensory-motor control and robotics; self-organizing neurodynamics; and mental disorders. Grossberg also collaborates with experimentalists to design experiments that test theoretical predictions and fill in conceptually important gaps in the experimental literature, carries out analyses of the mathematical dynamics of neural systems, and transfers biological neural models to applications in engineering and technology. He has published 18 books or journal special issues, over 560 research articles, and has 7 patents.

Grossberg has studied how brains give rise to minds since he took the introductory psychology course as a freshman at Dartmouth College in 1957. At that time, Grossberg introduced the paradigm of using nonlinear systems of differential equations to show how brain mechanisms can give rise to behavioral functions. This paradigm is helping to solve the classical mind/body problem, and is the basic mathematical formalism that is used in biological neural network research today. In particular, in 1957–1958, Grossberg discovered widely used equations for (1) short-term memory (STM), or neuronal activation (often called the Additive and Shunting models, or the Hopfield model after John Hopfield's 1984 application of the Additive model equation); (2) medium-term memory (MTM), or activity-dependent habituation (often called habituative transmitter gates, or depressing synapses after Larry Abbott's 1997 introduction of this term); and (3) long-term memory (LTM), or neuronal learning (often called gated steepest descent learning). One variant of these learning equations, called Instar Learning, was introduced by Grossberg in 1976 into Adaptive Resonance Theory and Self-Organizing Maps for the learning of adaptive filters in these models. This learning equation was also used by Kohonen in his applications of Self-Organizing Maps starting in 1984. Another variant of these learning equations, called Outstar Learning, was used by Grossberg starting in 1967 for spatial pattern learning. Outstar and Instar learning were combined by Grossberg in 1976 in a three-layer network for the learning of multi-dimensional maps from any m-dimensional input space to any n-dimensional output space. This application was called Counter-propagation by Hecht-Nielsen in 1987.

Building on his 1964 Rockefeller PhD thesis, in the 1960s and 1970s, Grossberg generalized the Additive and Shunting models to a class of dynamical systems that included these models as well as non-neural biological models, and proved content addressable memory theorems for this more general class of models. As part of this analysis, he introduced a Liapunov functional method to help classify the limiting and oscillatory dynamics of competitive systems by keeping track of which population is winning through time. This Liapunov method led him and Michael Cohen to discover in 1981 and publish in 1982 and 1983 a Liapunov function that they used to prove that global limits exist in a class of dynamical systems with symmetric interaction coefficients that includes the Additive and Shunting models. This model is often called the Cohen-Grossberg model and Liapunov function. John Hopfield published the special case of the Cohen-Grossberg Liapunov function for the Additive model in 1984. In 1987, Bart Kosko adapted the Cohen-Grossberg model and Liapunov function, which proved global convergence of STM, to define an Adaptive Bidirectional Associative Memory that combines STM and LTM and which also globally converges to a limit.

Grossberg has introduced, and developed with his colleagues, fundamental concepts, mechanisms, models, and architectures across a wide spectrum of topics about brain and behavior. He has collaborated with over 100 PhD students and postdoctoral fellows.

These models have provided unified and principled explanations of psychological and neurobiological data about processes including auditory and visual perception, attention, consciousness, cognition, cognitive-emotional interactions, and action in both typical, or normal, individuals and clinical patients. This work models how particular brain breakdowns or lesions cause behavioral symptoms of mental disorders such as Alzheimer's disease, autism, amnesia, PTSD, ADHD, visual and auditory agnosia and neglect, and slow-wave sleep.

The models have also been applied in many large-scale applications to engineering, technology, and AI. Taken together, they provide a blueprint for designing autonomous adaptive intelligent algorithms, agents, and mobile robots.

These results have been combined in a self-contained and non-technical exposition in a conversational style in Grossberg's 2021 publication Conscious Mind, Resonant Brain: How Each Brain Makes a Mind. This book won the 2022 PROSE book award in Neuroscience of the Association of American Publishers.

Models that Grossberg introduced and helped to develop include:

- the foundations of neural network research: competitive learning, self-organizing maps, instars, and masking fields (for classification), outstars (for spatial pattern learning), avalanches (for serial order learning and performance), gated dipoles (for opponent processing);
- perceptual and cognitive development, social cognition, working memory, cognitive information processing, planning, numerical estimation, and attention: Adaptive Resonance Theory (ART), ARTMAP, STORE, CORT-X, SpaN, LIST PARSE, lisTELOS, SMART, CRIB;
- visual perception, attention, consciousness, object and scene learning, recognition, predictive remapping, and search: BCS/FCS, FACADE, 3D LAMINART, aFILM, LIGHTSHAFT, Motion BCS, 3D FORMOTION, MODE, VIEWNET, dARTEX, cART, ARTSCAN, pARTSCAN, dARTSCAN, 3D ARTSCAN, ARTSCAN Search, ARTSCENE, ARTSCENE Search;
- auditory streaming, perception, speech, and language processing: SPINET, ARTSTREAM, NormNet, PHONET, ARTPHONE, ARTWORD;
- cognitive-emotional dynamics, reinforcement learning, motivated attention, and adaptively timed behavior: CogEM, START, MOTIVATOR; Spectral Timing;
- visual and spatial navigation: SOVEREIGN, STARS, ViSTARS, GRIDSmap, GridPlaceMap, Spectral Spacing;
- adaptive sensory-motor control of eye, arm, and leg movements: VITE, FLETE, VITEWRITE, DIRECT, VAM, CPG, SACCART, TELOS, SAC-SPEM;
- autism: iSTART

== Career and infrastructure development ==
Given that there was little or no infrastructure to support the fields that he and other modeling pioneers were advancing, Grossberg founded several institutions aimed at providing interdisciplinary training, research, and publication outlets in the fields of computational neuroscience, connectionist cognitive science, and neuromorphic technology. In 1981, he founded the Center for Adaptive Systems at Boston University and remains its director. In 1991, he founded the Department of Cognitive and Neural Systems at Boston University and served as its chairman until 2007. In 2004, he founded the NSF Center of Excellence for Learning in Education, Science, and Technology (CELEST) and served as its director until 2009.

All of these institutions were aimed at answering two related questions: i) How does the brain control behavior? ii) How can technology emulate biological intelligence?

In 1987, Grossberg founded and was first President of the International Neural Network Society (INNS), which grew to 3700 members from 49 states of the United States and 38 countries during the fourteen months of his presidency. The formation of INNS soon led to the formation of the European Neural Network Society (ENNS) and the Japanese Neural Network Society (JNNS). Grossberg also founded the INNS official journal, Neural Networks, and was its Editor-in-Chief from 1987 to 2010. Neural Networks is also the archival journal of ENNS and JNNS.

Grossberg's lecture series at MIT Lincoln Laboratory triggered the national DARPA Neural Network Study in 1987–88, which led to heightened government interest in neural network research. He was General Chairman of the first IEEE International Conference on Neural Networks (ICNN) in 1987 and played a key role in organizing the first INNS annual meeting in 1988, whose fusion in 1989 led to the International Joint Conference on Neural Networks (IJCNN), which remains the largest annual meeting devoted to neural network research. Grossberg has also organized and chaired the annual International Conference on Cognitive and Neural Systems (ICCNS) from 1997 to 2013, as well as many other conferences in the neural networks field.

Grossberg has served on the editorial board of 30 journals, including Journal of Cognitive Neuroscience, Behavioral and Brain Sciences, Cognitive Brain Research, Cognitive Science, Neural Computation, IEEE Transactions on Neural Networks, IEEE Expert, and the International Journal of Humanoid Robotics.

== Adaptive Resonance Theory (ART) ==
With Gail Carpenter, Grossberg developed the adaptive resonance theory (ART). ART is a cognitive and neural theory of how the brain can quickly learn, and stably remember and recognize, objects and events in a changing world. ART proposed a solution of the stability-plasticity dilemma; namely, how a brain or machine can learn quickly about new objects and events without just as quickly being forced to forget previously learned, but still useful, memories.

ART predicts how learned top-down expectations focus attention on expected combinations of features, leading to a synchronous resonance that can drive fast learning. ART also predicts how large enough mismatches between bottom-up feature patterns and top-down expectations can drive a memory search, or hypothesis testing, for recognition categories with which to better learn to classify the world. ART thus defines a type of self-organizing production system.

ART was practically demonstrated through the ART family of classifiers (e.g., ART 1, ART 2, ART 2A, ART 3, ARTMAP, fuzzy ARTMAP, ART eMAP, distributed ARTMAP), developed with Gail Carpenter, which has been used in large-scale applications in engineering and technology where fast, yet stable, incrementally learned classification and prediction are needed.

Grossberg has predicted that "all conscious states are resonant states". He has hereby shown how properties of learning without catastrophic forgetting are ensured in ART via attentional matching between bottom-up feature patterns and learned top-down expectations, leading to a resonant state that persists long enough to drive learning between attended critical feature patterns and active recognition categories. Such a resonant state can also lead to conscious awareness when it includes feature-selective cells that represent qualia. In this way, Grossberg has used ART to explain many mind and brain data about how humans consciously see, hear, feel, and know things about their unique changing worlds, while using these conscious representations to plan and act to realize valued goals.

== New computational paradigms ==
Grossberg has introduced and led the development of two computational paradigms that are relevant to biological intelligence and its applications:

Complementary Computing

What is the nature of brain specialization? Many scientists have proposed that our brains possess independent modules, as in a digital computer. The brain's organization into distinct anatomical areas and processing streams shows that brain processing is indeed specialized. However, independent modules should be able to fully compute their particular processes on their own. Much behavioral data argue against this possibility.

Complementary Computing (Grossberg, 2000, 2012) concerns the discovery that pairs of parallel cortical processing streams compute complementary properties in the brain. Each stream has complementary computational strengths and weaknesses, much as in physical principles like the Heisenberg Uncertainty Principle. Each cortical stream can also possess multiple processing stages. These stages realize a hierarchical resolution of uncertainty. "Uncertainty" here means that computing one set of properties at a given stage prevents computation of a complementary set of properties at that stage.

Complementary Computing proposes that the computational unit of brain processing that has behavioral significance consists of parallel interactions between complementary cortical processing streams with multiple processing stages to compute complete information about a particular type of biological intelligence.

Laminar Computing

The cerebral cortex, the seat of higher intelligence in all modalities, is organized into layered circuits (often six main layers) that undergo characteristic bottom-up, top-down, and horizontal interactions. How do specializations of this shared laminar design embody different types of biological intelligence, including vision, speech and language, and cognition? Laminar Computing proposes how this can happen (Grossberg, 1999, 2012).

Laminar Computing explains how the laminar design of neocortex may realize the best properties of feedforward and feedback processing, digital and analog processing, and bottom-up data-driven processing and top-down attentive hypothesis-driven processing. Embodying such designs into VLSI chips promises to enable the development of increasingly general-purpose adaptive autonomous algorithms for multiple applications.

== Awards ==
Awards granted to Grossberg:

- 1969 Norbert Wiener Medal for Cybernetics
- 1991 IEEE Neural Network Pioneer Award for "fundamental understanding and engineering application in the field of neural networks".
- 1992 INNS Leadership Award
- 1992 Boston Computer Society Thinking Technology Award
- 2000 Information Science Award of the Association for Intelligent Machinery
- 2002 Charles River Laboratories prize of the Society for Behavioral Toxicology
- 2003 Helmholtz Award from INNS which is given "for outstanding contributions to research in perception".
- 2015 Norman Anderson Lifetime Achievement Award of the Society of Experimental Psychologists "for his pioneering theoretical research on how brains give rise to minds and his foundational contributions to computational neuroscience and connectionist cognitive science". His acceptance speech can be found here.
- 2017 Institute of Electrical and Electronics Engineers (IEEE) Frank Rosenblatt Award with the following citation: "For contributions to understanding brain cognition and behavior and their emulation by technology".
- 2019 Donald O. Hebb award from INNS which is given "for outstanding contributions to research in biological learning".
- 2022 PROSE book award in Neuroscience of the Association of American Publishers for his 2021 Magnum Opus: Conscious Mind, Resonant Brain: How Each Brain Makes a Mind.
- 2022 Lofti A. Zadeh Pioneer Award from the IEEE Systems, Man, and Cybernetics Society for "seminal contributions to understanding brain cognition and behavior and their emulation by technology."
- 2023 Computer Science Leader Award of Research.com

Memberships:

- 1990 member of the Memory Disorders Research Society
- 1994 Fellow of the American Psychological Association
- 1996 Fellow of the Society of Experimental Psychologists
- 2002 Fellow of the American Psychological Society
- 2005 IEEE Fellow
- 2008 Inaugural Fellow of the American Educational Research Association
- 2011 INNS Fellow

== See also ==
- Grossberg network
