= Ian Munro (computer scientist) =

Canadian computer scientist

J. Ian Munro
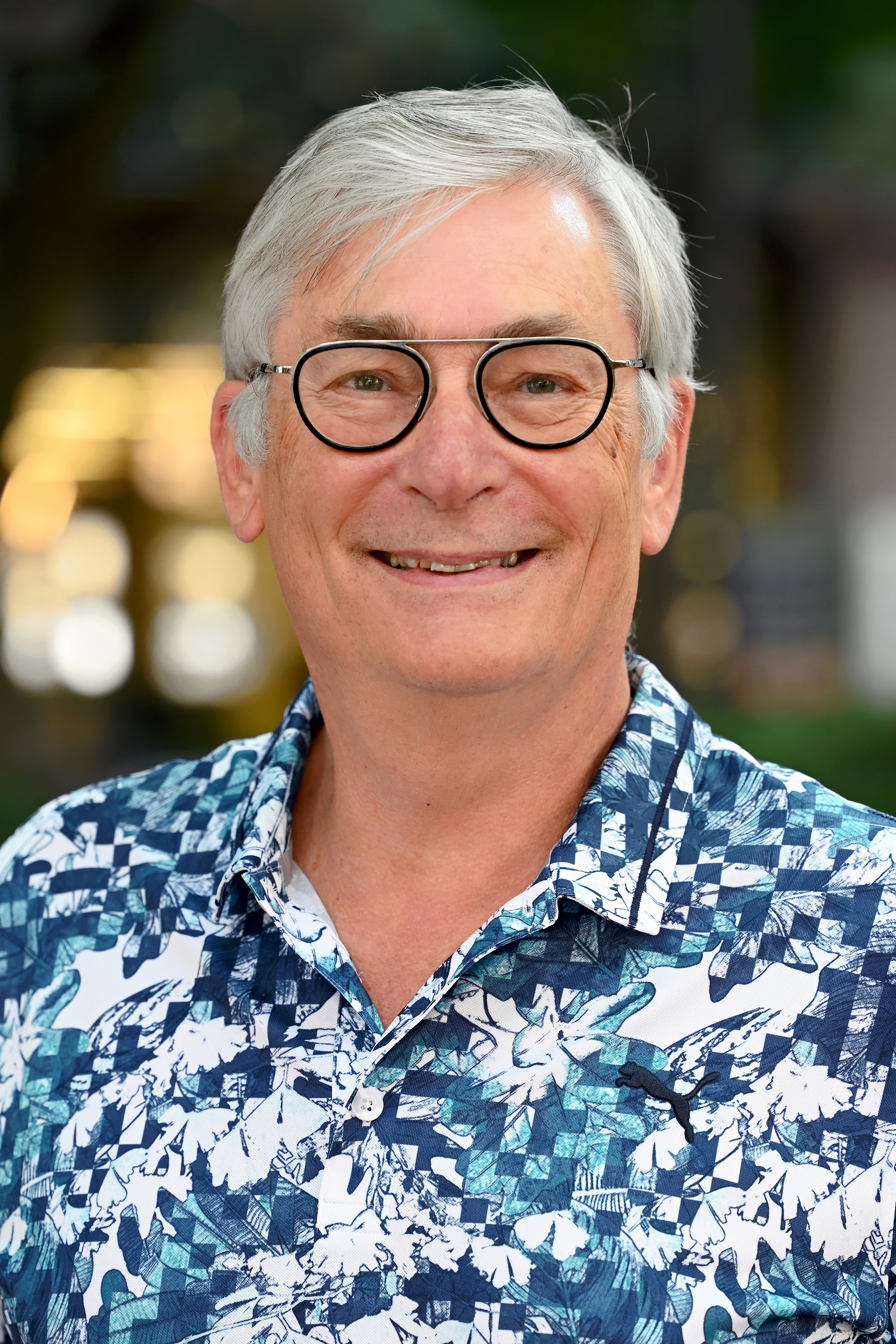
- Born: July 10, 1947 (age 79)
- Education: University of New Brunswick; University of British Columbia; University of Toronto
- Known for: Algorithms and data structures Succinct data structure Implicit data structure
- Scientific career
- Fields: Computer Science
- Workplaces: University of Waterloo
- Thesis: Some Results in the Study of Algorithms (1971)
- Doctoral advisor: Allan Borodin

James Ian Munro (born July 10, 1947) is a Canadian computer scientist. He is known for his fundamental contributions to algorithms and data structures (including optimal binary search trees, priority queues, hashing, and space-efficient data structures).

After earning a bachelor's degree in 1968 from the University of New Brunswick and a master's in 1969 from the University of British Columbia, Munro finished his doctorate in 1971 from the University of Toronto, under the supervision of Allan Borodin. In Munro & Suwanda (1980), he formalized the notion of an implicit data structure, and has continued work in this area. He is currently a University Professor in the David R. Cheriton School of Computer Science at the University of Waterloo and the Canada Research Chair in Algorithm Design (Tier I), a research title that was first given in 2001 and was renewed most recently in 2016.

== Awards and honours ==
Munro was elected as a member of the Royal Society of Canada in 2003. He became an ACM Fellow in 2008 for his contributions to algorithms and data structures.

In 2013 a conference was held at Waterloo in his honor, and a festschrift was published as its proceedings.

== Partial bibliography ==
- Munro, J. Ian; Suwanda, Hendra (October 1980). "Implicit data structures for fast search and update". Journal of Computer and System Sciences. 21 (2): 236–250. doi:10.1016/0022-0000(80)90037-9.
