= Worst case analysis =

Worst case analysis was, from 1978 until 1986, a doctrine under 40 U.S.C. § 1502.22 which mandated that an environmental impact statement include such an analysis:

When an agency is evaluating significant adverse effects on the human environment in an environmental impact statement and there are gaps in relevant information or scientific uncertainty, the agency shall always make clear that such information is lacking or that uncertainty exists.

(a) If the information relevant to adverse impacts is essential to a reasoned choice among alternatives and is not known and the overall costs of obtaining it are not exorbitant, the agency shall include the information in the environmental impact statement.

(b) If (1) the information relevant to adverse impacts is essential to a reasoned choice among alternatives and is not known and the overall costs of obtaining it are exorbitant or (2) the information is relevant to adverse impacts, is important to the decision and the means to obtain it are not known (e.g., the means for obtaining it are beyond the state of the art) the agency shall weigh the need for the action against the risk and severity of possible adverse impacts were the action to proceed in the face of uncertainty. If the agency proceeds, it shall include a worst case analysis and an indication of the probability or improbability of its occurrence.

It led to a 1989 SCOTUS decision, written by John Paul Stevens and reported in Robertson v. Methow Valley Citizens Council, after a decision by GOODWIN and FERGUSON, STEPHENS to reverse the Federal District Court of Oregon ruling that the Regional Forester did not violate any laws when he issued a special use permit for a ski resort development in a roadless area in Okanogan National Forest in Washington state.

The Rehnquist Court concluded

that NEPA does not require a fully developed plan detailing what steps will be taken to mitigate adverse environmental impacts and does not require a "worst case analysis." In addition, we hold that the Forest Service has adopted a permissible interpretation of its own regulations.
