= Allan Borodin =

Canadian-American computer scientist

- Born: 1941 (age 84–85)
- Education: Rutgers University; Stevens Institute of Technology; Cornell University
- Awards: ACM Fellow (2014); Order of Canada (2020)
- Scientific career
- Fields: Theoretical computer science
- Workplaces: University of Toronto
- Thesis: Computational Complexity and the Existence of Complexity Gaps (1969)
- Doctoral advisor: Juris Hartmanis
- Website: www.cs.toronto.edu/~bor/

Allan Bertram Borodin CM (born 1941) is a Canadian-American computer scientist who is a professor at the University of Toronto.

== Biography ==
Borodin did his undergraduate studies at Rutgers University, earning a bachelor's degree in mathematics in 1963. After earning a master's degree at the Stevens Institute of Technology in 1966 (while at the same time working part time as a programmer at Bell Laboratories), he continued his graduate studies at Cornell University, completing a doctorate in 1969 under the supervision of Juris Hartmanis. He joined the Toronto faculty in 1969 and was promoted to full professor in 1977. He served as department chair from 1980 to 1985, and became University Professor in 2011.

== Awards and honors ==
Borodin was elected as a member of the Royal Society of Canada in 1991. In 2008 he won the CRM-Fields-PIMS prize. He became a fellow of the American Association for the Advancement of Science in 2011, and a fellow of the Association for Computing Machinery in 2014 "For contributions to theoretical computer science in complexity, on-line algorithms, resource tradeoffs, and models of algorithmic paradigms." In 2020 he received the Order of Canada.

== Selected publications ==
Research articles

- Borodin, Allan (1972). "Computational complexity and the existence of complexity gaps". Journal of the ACM. 19 (1): 158–174. doi:10.1145/321679.321691. S2CID 2387962.
- Borodin, Allan (1977). "On relating time and space to size and depth". SIAM Journal on Computing. 6 (4): 733–744. doi:10.1137/0206054. MR 0461984.
- Ben-David, S.; Borodin, A.; Karp, R.; Tardos, G.; Wigderson, A. (1994). "On the power of randomization in on-line algorithms". Algorithmica. 11 (1): 2–14. doi:10.1007/BF01294260. MR 1247985. S2CID 26771869.

Books

- Borodin, Allan; Munro, Ian (1975). The Computational Complexity of Algebraic and Numeric Problems. Elsevier Computer Science Library; Theory of Computation Series. Vol. 1. New York, London, Amsterdam: American Elsevier Publishing Co., Inc. MR 0468309.
- Borodin, A.; El-Yaniv, R. (1998). Online Computation and Competitive Analysis. Cambridge University Press. ISBN 978-0-521-56392-5.

== See also ==
- Gap theorem
- Online algorithms
- Computational Complexity
