= Paris Kanellakis =

American computer scientist (1953–1995)

Paris Christos Kanellakis
- Born: December 3, 1953; Athens, Greece
- Died: December 20, 1995 (aged 42) near Buga, Colombia; 3°50′45.2″N 76°06′17.1″W
- Citizenship: Greece; United States
- Education: National Technical University of Athens; MIT
- Known for: The eponymous award given annually by the ACM.
- Spouse: Maria Teresa Otoya
- Awards: IBM Associate Professor of Computer Science (Brown University, 1989-90), Sloan Research Fellowship (Mathematics, 1987-89), IBM Faculty Development Award (1985-87)
- Scientific career
- Fields: computer science (theoretical)
- Workplaces: Brown University, MIT, INRIA, IBM T.J. Watson Research Center
- Thesis: The complexity of concurrency control for distributed databases (1982)
- Doctoral advisor: Christos H. Papadimitriou
- Doctoral students: Sridhar Ramaswamy; Scott A. Smolka
- Website: www.cs.brown.edu/~pck/

Paris Christos Kanellakis (Greek: Πάρις Χρήστος Κανελλάκης; December 3, 1953 – December 20, 1995) was a Greek American computer scientist.

== Life and academic path ==
Kanellakis was born on December 3, 1953, in Athens as the only child of General Eleftherios and Mrs. Argyroula Kanellakis.

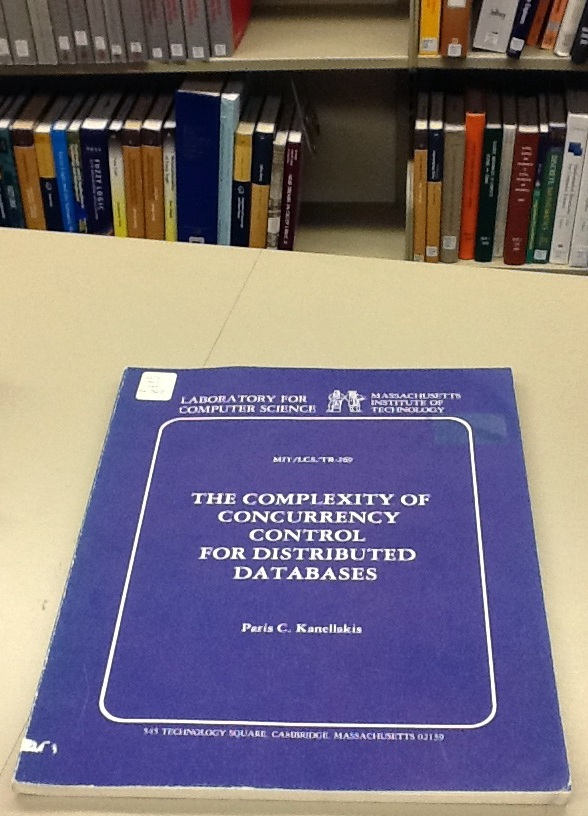
A copy of Kanellakis's Ph.D. thesis in a library at MIT.

In 1976, he received a diploma in electrical engineering from the National Technical University of Athens, with a thesis supervised by Emmanuel Protonotarios. He continued his studies at the graduate level in electrical engineering and computer science at the Massachusetts Institute of Technology. He received his M.Sc. degree in 1978. His thesis Algorithms for a scheduling application of the Asymmetric Traveling Salesman Problem was supervised by Ron Rivest and Michael Athans, while Christos Papadimitriou (then professor at Harvard) was also involved. He then continued working for his Ph.D. with Papadimitriou (who was then also at MIT) as advisor. He submitted his thesis The complexity of concurrency control for distributed databases in September 1981. He was awarded the doctorate degree in February 1982.

In 1981, he joined the Computer Science Department at Brown University as assistant professor. He obtained tenure as associate professor in 1986, and became full professor in 1990. He interrupted his stay at Brown in 1984 for a junior sabbatical as visiting assistant professor at the MIT Laboratory for Computer Science, working with Nancy Lynch, and in 1988 for a year at INRIA on special assignment leave, working with Serge Abiteboul. Between 1982 and 1991, he paid several short visits to the IBM T.J. Watson Research Center.

His awards include an IBM Faculty Development Award (1985) and a Sloan Research Fellowship in mathematics (1987–1989). During 1989–90, he was IBM Associate Professor of Computer Science.

He was born a Greek citizen, and obtained U.S. citizenship in 1988.

Kanellakis died on December 20, 1995, together with his wife, Maria Teresa Otoya, and their two children, Alexandra and Stephanos, in the crash of American Airlines Flight 965 while en route to an annual holiday reunion with his wife's family.

== Research and academic service ==
His scientific contributions lie in the fields of database theory—comprising work on deductive databases, object-oriented databases, and constraint databases—as well as in fault-tolerant distributed computation and in type theory.

While at Brown, he supervised seven Ph.D. theses there (Smolka 1985, Revesz 1991, Shvartsman 1992, Mitchell 1993, Hillebrand 1994, Ramaswamy 1995, and Goldin 1997) and one at MIT (Cosmadakis 1985). He participated in the program committees of numerous editions of international meetings, including PODS, VLDB, LICS, STOC, FOCS, STACS, and PODC. He served as editorial advisor to the scientific journals Information and Computation, SIAM Journal on Computing, Theoretical Computer Science, ACM Transactions on Database Systems, Journal of Logic Programming, Chicago Journal of Theoretical Computer Science, and Applied Mathematics Letters. (He was also involved in the first steps of Constraints.)

Together with Alex Shvartsman, they co-authored the monograph Fault-Tolerant Parallel Computation. At the time of his death, the book was still incomplete.

== Posthumous ==
Memorials

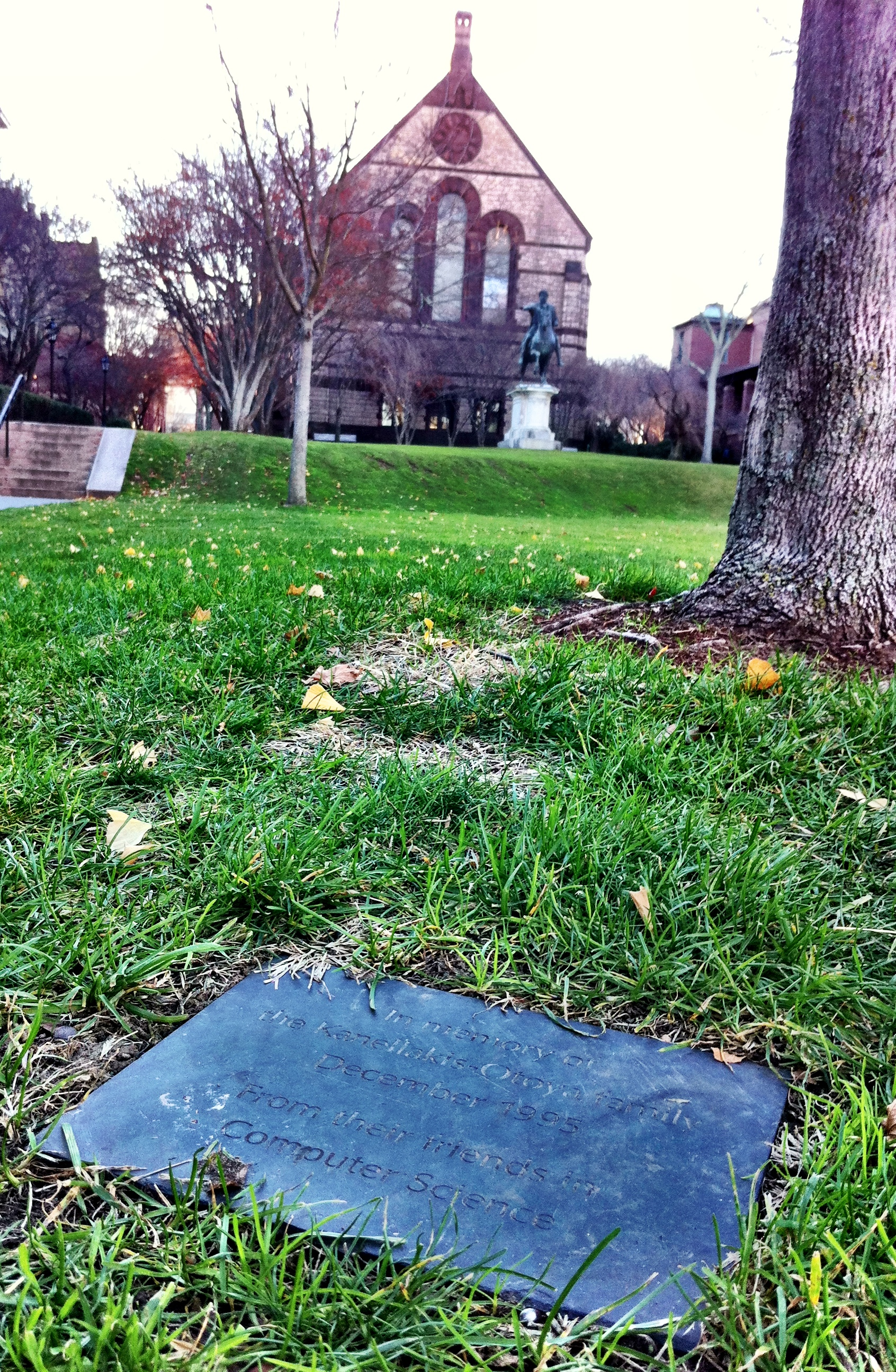
Plaque in front of the memorial tree at Brown: In memory of the Kanellakis-Otoya family / December 1995 / from their friends in Computer Science

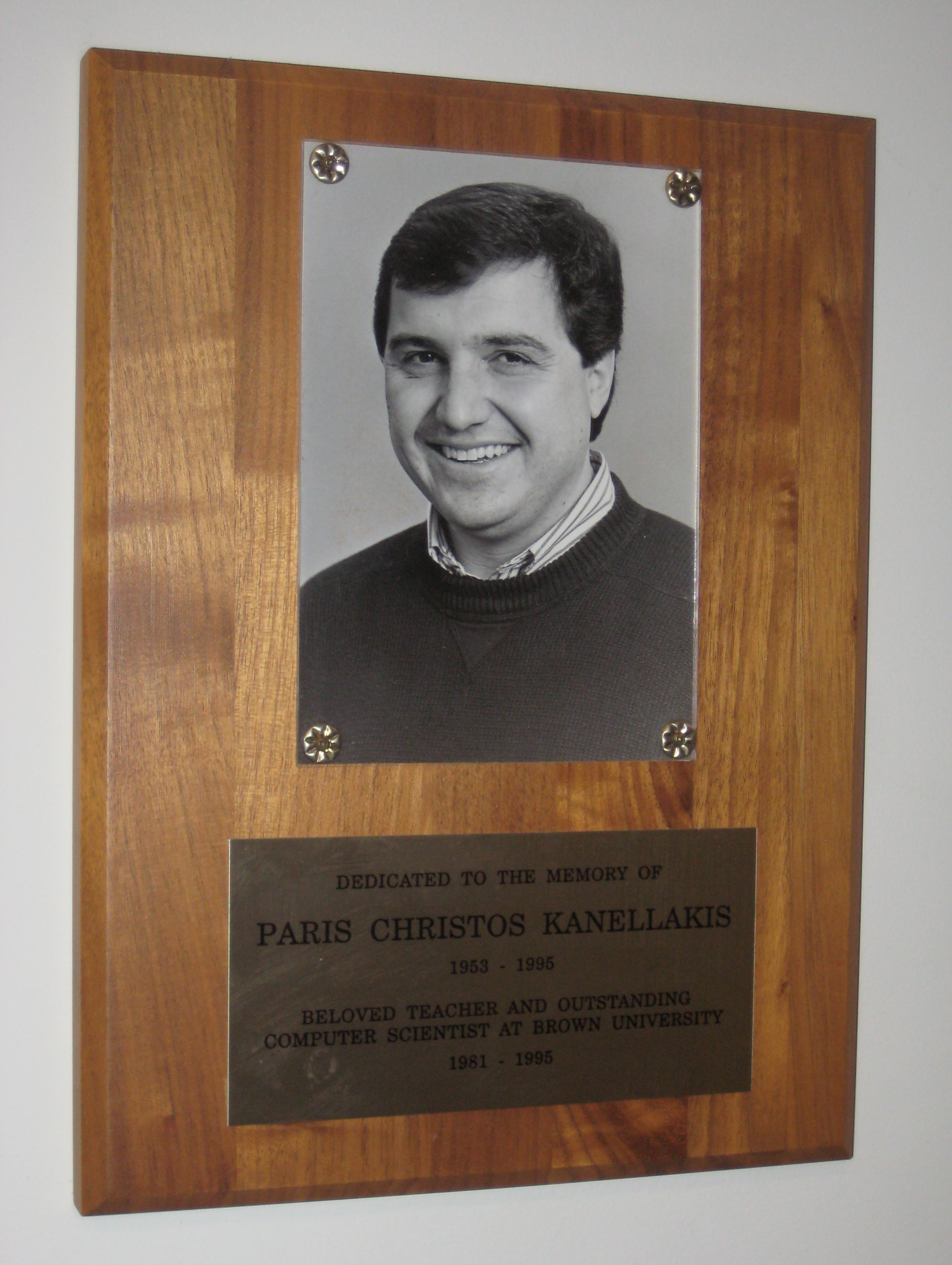
Plaque in the Computer Science library at Brown: Dedicated to the memory of Paris Christos Kanellakis / 1953-1995 / Beloved teacher and outstanding computer scientist at Brown University / 1981-1995

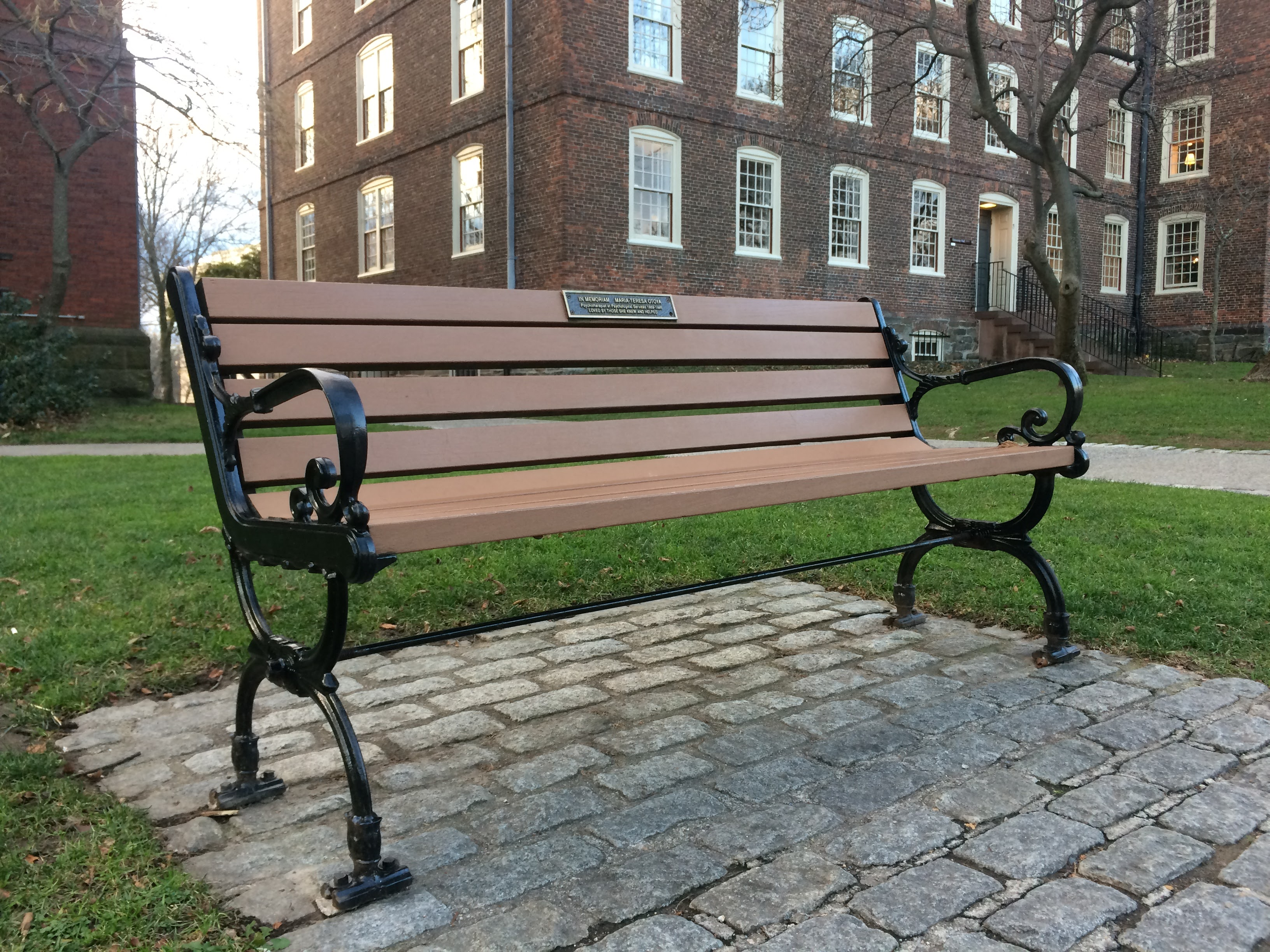
Bench on the Main Green at Brown: IN MEMORIAM MARIA-TERESA OTOYA / Psychotherapist at Psychological Services 1989-1995 / LOVED BY THOSE SHE KNEW AND HELPED

=== Awards ===
In 1996, the Association for Computing Machinery instituted the Paris Kanellakis Theory and Practice Award, which is granted yearly to honor "specific theoretical accomplishments that have had a significant and demonstrable effect on the practice of computing". Past recipients include Leonard Adleman, Whitfield Diffie, Martin Hellman, Ralph Merkle, Ron Rivest, and Adi Shamir, Abraham Lempel and Jacob Ziv, Randy Bryant, Edmund Clarke, E. Allen Emerson, and Ken McMillan, Danny Sleator and Robert Tarjan, Narendra Karmarkar, Eugene Myers, Peter Franaszek, Gary Miller, Michael Rabin, Robert Solovay, and Volker Strassen, Yoav Freund and Robert Schapire, Gerard Holzmann, Robert Kurshan, Moshe Vardi, and Pierre Wolper, Robert Brayton, Bruno Buchberger, Corinna Cortes and Vladimir Vapnik, Mihir Bellare and Phillip Rogaway, Kurt Mehlhorn, Hanan Samet, Andrei Broder, Moses Charikar, and Piotr Indyk, and Robert Blumofe and Charles Leiserson.

After donations from Kanellakis's parents, three graduate fellowships and a prize have been established in his memory at the three institutions where he studied and worked: Brown, MIT, and NTUA.

- Since 1997, the Department of Computer Science at Brown has been offering two Paris Kanellakis Fellowships every year, each of which lasts for one year and is awarded preferably to graduate students from Greece. Past recipients include Christos Amanatidis, Aris Anagnostopoulos, Alexandru Balan, Foteini Baldimtsi, Glencora L. Borradaile, Costas Busch, Irina Calciu, Daniel Acevedo Feliz, Esha Gosh, Arjun Guha, Serdar Kadioglu, Evgenios Kornaropoulos, Hammurabi Mendes, Michail Michailidis, Tomer Moscovich, Shay Mozes, Olga Ohrimenko, Olga Papaemmanouil, Charalampos (Babis) Papamanthou, Alexandra Papoutsaki, Eric Ely Rachlin, Emmanuel (Manos) Renieris, Warren Schudy, Nikos Triandopoulos, Ioannis (Yannis) Tsochantaridis, Aggeliki Tsoli, and Ioannis (Yannis) Vergados.
- Since 1999, the Department of Electrical Engineering and Computer Science at MIT has been offering one Paris Kanellakis Fellowship every year, which lasts for one year and is awarded to a graduate student who is either Greek or American of Greek descent. Past recipients include Nikolaos Andrikogiannopoulos, Georgios Angelopoulos, Christos Mario Christoudias, Apostolos Fertis, Vasileios-Marios Gkortsas, Themistoklis Gouleakis, Manolis Kamvysselis (Kellis), Christos Kapoutsis, Aristeidis Karalis, Georgia-Evangelia (Yola) Katsargyri, Georgios Papachristoudis, Anastasios (Tasos) Sidiropoulos, Katerina Sotiraki, and Christos Tzamos.
- Since 2000, NTUA has been offering one Paris Kanellakis Prize every year, which is awarded to the student of the School of Electrical and Computer Engineering who earns the greatest GPA over all courses of the third and fourth years of study in the field of Information Technology. Past recipients include Christina Giannoula, Spyridon Antonakopoulos, Georgios Assimenos, Constantinos Daskalakis, Ilias Diakonikolas, Theodoros Kassambalis, Nikolas Ioannou, Iassonas Kokkinos, Leonidas Lambropoulos, Emmanouel Papadakis, Charalambos Samios, and Charis Volos.

=== Events ===
In 1996, the Computer Science Department at Brown declared its 17th Industrial Partners Program symposium a celebration of Kanellakis's research career, inviting lectures by some of his co-authors. Several meetings scheduled for 1996 and 1997, in some of which Kanellakis had been expected to participate in various roles, modified their programs to honor his memory and/or dedicated their proceedings to it. In 2002, the first Hellenic Data Management Symposium was held in his memory. In 2003, the meeting Principles of Computing & Knowledge: Paris C. Kanellakis Memorial Workshop was organized on the occasion of his 50th birthday.

In 2001, the Computer Science Department at Brown inaugurated the annual Paris Kanellakis Memorial Lecture, which is usually presented late in the fall semester, often by former co-authors and colleagues of Kanellakis. Past lectures were given by Arvind, Cynthia Dwork, Anna Karlin, Richard Karp, Jon Kleinberg, Nancy Lynch (and Alex Shvartsman), John Mitchell, Eugene Myers, Christos Papadimitriou, Michael Rabin, Daniel Spielman, Moshe Vardi, Mihalis Yannakakis, and Andrew Yao.

=== Other ===
In the few years after Kanellakis's death, several scientific journals published technical obituaries of him and/or dedicated an issue to his memory. Individual authors dedicated their doctorate theses or papers.

In 1996, a Norway maple tree was planted in memory of Kanellakis and his family in Lincoln Field at Brown. The following year, the Department of Computer Science renamed its library in his honor. The sculpture Horizon by Costas Varotsos, commissioned by Kanellakis's parents in their son's and his family's memory, was installed near Liya, Corinthia, in Greece, on family-owned land which has been donated to SOS Children's Villages.
