= Symposium on Foundations of Computer Science =

IEEE conference for theoretical computer science

The IEEE Annual Symposium on Foundations of Computer Science (FOCS) is an academic conference in the field of theoretical computer science. FOCS is sponsored by the IEEE Computer Society.

As Fich (1996) writes, FOCS and its annual Association for Computing Machinery counterpart STOC (the Symposium on Theory of Computing) are considered the two top conferences in theoretical computer science, considered broadly: they "are forums for some of the best work throughout theory of computing that promote breadth among theory of computing researchers and help to keep the community together." Johnson (1984) includes regular attendance at FOCS and STOC as one of several defining characteristics of theoretical computer scientists.

== Awards ==
The Knuth Prize for outstanding contributions to theoretical computer science is presented alternately at FOCS and STOC. Works of the highest quality presented at the conference are awarded the Best Paper Award. In addition, the Machtey Award is presented to the best student-authored paper in FOCS.

== History ==
In 1960–1965, FOCS was known as the Symposium on Switching Circuit Theory and Logical Design, and in 1966–1974 it was known as the Symposium on Switching and Automata Theory. The current name has been used since 1975. The publisher uses the acronym SFCS on their web sites for the conferences in 1975 to 1987.

The cover pages of the conference feature an artwork entitled synapse, by Alvy Ray Smith; Smith donated the original artwork to the Simons Institute in 2023.

== Location ==
FOCS is almost exclusively held in North America, and in particular in the United States, with few exceptions.

Year	PC and Local Chairs	Location	Steering Committee	Test of Time Award Committee
1961
1962
1963
1964		Princeton, NJ		
1965
1966
1967
1968
1969
1970
1971
1972
1973
1974
1975	Daniel Rosenkrantz (PC Chair), Eugene Lawler (Local Chair)	Berkeley		
1976	Michael Fischer (PC Chair), Meera Blattner (Local Chair)	Houston		
1977	Paul Young (PC Chair), John Savage (Local Chair)	Providence		
1978	Nancy Lynch (PC Chair), William Rounds (Local Chair)	Ann Arbor		
1979	Rao Kosaraju (PC Chair), Rolando Peinado (Local Chair)	San Juan, Puerto Rico		
1980		Syracuse		
1981	Arnold Rosenberg (PC Chair), Patrick Fischer (Local Chair)	Nashville		
1982		Chicago		
1983	Lawrence Snyder (PC Chair), Peter Downey (Local Chair)	Tucson		
1984		Singer Island		
1985	Robert Tarjan (PC Chair), Eugene Luks (Local Chair)	Portland		
1986	John Hopcroft (PC Chair), Charles Rackoff (Local Chair)	Toronto	Ashok Chandra (TCMF Chair)	
1987	Tom Leighton (PC Chair), Seymour Ginsburg (Local Chair), Ming-Deh Huang (Local Chair)	Los Angeles	"	
1988		White Plains		
1989	Zvi Galil (PC Chair), Jon Reif (Local Chair)	Research Triangle Park	Christos Papadimitriou (TCMF Chair)	
1990	Mihalis Yannakakis (PC Chair), Jonathan Turner (Local Chair)	St. Louis	"	
1991	Mike Sipser (PC Chair), Tom Leighton (Local Chair), Alok Aggarwal (Local Chair)	San Juan, Puerto Rico	"	
1992	Michael Luby (PC Chair), Gary Miller (Local Chair)	Pittsburgh		
1993	Leonidas J. Guibas (PC Chair), Andrei Broder (Local Chair)	Palo Alto		
1994	Shafi Goldwasser (PC Chair), Sorin Istrail (Local Chair)	Santa Fe		
1995	Prabhakar Raghavan (PC Chair), Aditi Dhagat (Local Chair), Rene Peralta (Local Chair)	Milwaukee		
1996	Martin Tompa (PC Chair), Carl Smith (Local Chair)	Burlington		
1997	Anna Karlin (PC Chair), Victor Milenkovic (Local Chair)	Miami Beach		
1998	Rajeev Motwani, Michael Mitzenmacher (Local Chair)	Palo Alto		
1999	Paul Beame (PC Chair), Piotr Berman (Local Chair)	New York		
2000	Avrim Blum (PC Chair), Marek Chrobak (Local Chair), Tao Jiang (Local Chair)	Redondo Beach		
2001	Moni Naor (PC Chair), Lawrence Larmore (Local Chair), Wolfgang Bein	Las Vegas		
2002	Bernard Chazelle (PC Chair) Arvind Gupta (Local Chair)	Vancouver, Canada		
2003	Madhu Sudan (PC Chair), Michael Mitzenmacher (Local Chair)	Cambridge		
2004	Eli Upfal(PC Chair), Giuseppe F. Italiano (Local Chair)	Rome, Italy		
2005	Eva Tardos (PC Chair), Avrim Blum (Local Chair), Anupam Gupta (Local Chair)	Pittsburgh		
2006	Sanjeev Arora, Satish Rao (Local Chair)	Berkeley		
2007	Alistair Sinclair (PC Chair), Philip Klein (Local Chair), Anna Lysyanskaya (Local Chair), Claire Mathieu (Local Chair)	Providence		
2008	R. Ravi (PC Chair), Sudipto Guha (Local Chair), Sanjeev Khanna (Local Chair), Sampath Kannan (Local Chair)	Philadelphia	Paul Beame (TCMF Chair)	
2009	Dan Spielman (PC Chair), David Shmoys (General co-Chair), Milena Mihail (Local Chair), Prasad Tetali (Local Chair)	Atlanta	"	
2010	Luca Trevisan (PC Chair), Larry Larmore (Local Chair)	Las Vegas	"	
2011	Rafail Ostrovsky (PC Chair), Marek Chrobak (Local Chair), Neal Yong (Local Chair),	Palm Springs	"	
2012	Tim Roughgarden (PC Chair), Rebecca Wright (Local Chair), Lisa Zhang (Local Chair), Boaz Barak (Workshop Chair), Avrim Blum (Workshop Chair)	New Brunswick	David Shmoys (TCMF Chair)	
2013	Omer Reingold (PC Chair), Christos Papadimitriou (Local Chair), Umesh Vazirani (Local Chair), Moses Charikar (Workshop Chair), Chris Umans (Workshop Chair)	Berkeley	"	
2014	Boaz Barak (PC Chair), Rebecca Wright (Local Chair), Lisa Zhang (Local Chair), Sanjeev Khanna (Workshop Chair), Kunal Talwar (Workshop Chair)	Philadelphia	"	
2015	Venkatesan Guruswami (PC Chair), Kristin Kane (Local Chair), Prasad Raghavendra, Luca Trevisan	Berkeley	Rafail Ostrovsky (TCMF Chair)	
2016	Irit Dinur (PC Chair), Rebecca Wright (Local Chair), Lisa Zhang (Local Chair), Alexandr Andoni (Workshop Chair), Aleksander Mądry (Workshop Chair)	New Brunswick	"	
2017	Chris Umans (PC Chair), Andrew Jan (Local Chair), Prasad Raghavendra (Local Chair), Aleksander Mądry (Workshop Chair), James R. Lee (Workshop Chair)	Berkeley	"	
2018	Mikkel Thorup (PC Chair), Adi Rosén (Local Chair), Sophie Laplante (Local co-Chair), Alessandro Luongo (Local co-Chair), Robert Kleinberg (Workshop Chair), James R. Lee (Workshop Chair)	Paris, France	Yuval Rabani (TCMF Chair), Shang-Hua Teng (TCMF Vice Chair), Avrim Blum, Shafi Goldwasser, Rafail Ostrovsky, Toniann Pitassi	
2019	David Zuckerman (PC Chair), Michael Dinitz (Local Chair), Maria-Florina Balcan (Workshop Chair), Robert Kleinberg (Workshop Chair)	Baltimore	"	Paul Beame, Allan Borodin, Uriel Feige, Monika Henzinger, Johan Håstad (chair), Mihalis Yannakakis (inaugural award)
2020	Sandy Irani (PC Chair), Debmalya Panigrahi (Local Chair), Kamesh Munagala (Local Chair), Maria-Florina Balcan (Workshop Chair), Alexander Sherstov (Workshop Chair)	Virtual (planned for Raleigh/Durham)	"	Paul Beame (chair), Uriel Feige, Anna Karlin, Yishay Mansour, Claire Mathieu, Luca Trevisan
2021	Nisheeth Vishnoi (PC Chair), Alexandra Kolla (Local/Finance Chair), Vincent Cohen-Addad (Workshop Chair), Alexander Sherstov (Workshop Chair)	Virtual (planned for Denver)	"	Russell Impagliazzo, Yael Tauman Kalai, Anna Karlin, Yishay Mansour, Michael Saks, Luca Trevisan (chair)
2022	Jelani Nelson (PC chair), Alexandra Kolla (Local Chair), Rong Ge (Finance Chair), Vincent Cohen-Addad (Workshop Chair), Henry Yuen (Workshop Chair)	Denver	Shang-Hua Teng (TCMF Chair), Venkatesan Guruswami (TCMF Vice Chair), Avrim Blum, Shafi Goldwasser, Rafail Ostrovsky, Toniann Pitassi, Yuval Rabani	Russell Impagliazzo, Yael Tauman Kalai, Michael Saks (chair), Alistair Sinclair, Éva Tardos, David Zuckerman
2023	Amit Sahai (PC Chair), Shubhangi Saraf (PC Co-chair), Thomas Vidick (PC Co-chair), Alexandra Kolla (General Chair), Pravesh Kothari (Workshop Chair), Henry Yuen (Workshop Chair)	Santa Cruz	"	Jin-Yi Cai, Faith Ellen, Leonard Schulman, Alistair Sinclair, Éva Tardos, David Zuckerman (chair)
2024	Santosh Vempala (PC Chair), Aravindan Vijayaraghavan (General Chair), Lev Reyzin (General Chair), Mohsen Ghaffari (Workshop Chair), Pravesh Kothari (Workshop Chair)	Chicago	Ran Canetti (TCMF Chair), Rocco Servedio (TCMF Vice Chair)	Jin-Yi Cai (chair), Julia Chuzhoy, Constantinos Daskalakis, Faith Ellen, Shafi Goldwasser, Leonard Schulman
2025	Ran Raz (PC Chair), Rotem Oshman (PC Co-chair), Clément Canonne (General Chair), Troy Lee (Finance Chair), Mohsen Ghaffari (Workshop Chair), Dakshita Khurana (Workshop Chair)	Sydney, Australia	Ran Canetti (TCMF Chair), Rocco Servedio (TCMF Vice Chair)	Shafi Goldwasser (chair), Julia Chuzhoy, Constantinos Daskalakis, Irit Dinur, Piotr Indyk, Ryan O'Donnell

== See also ==
- Conferences in theoretical computer science.
- The list of computer science conferences contains other academic conferences in computer science.
