= Simons Institute for the Theory of Computing =

Research institute in Berkeley, California

Coordinates: 37°52′16″N 122°15′14″W

- Formation: 2012
- Type: Theoretical computer science research institute
- Location: Berkeley, California, U.S.
- Director: Shafi Goldwasser
- Website: simons.berkeley.edu

The Simons Institute for the Theory of Computing at the University of California, Berkeley is an institute for collaborative research in theoretical computer science.

== History ==
Established on July 1, 2012 with a grant of $60 million from the Simons Foundation, the Institute is housed in Calvin Lab on the Berkeley campus. The Simons Institute brings together the leading researchers and young scholars in theoretical computer science and related fields to explore unsolved problems about the nature and limits of computation.

Richard M. Karp was Founding Director of the Institute, and fellow Turing Award winner Shafi Goldwasser took over as Director on January 1, 2018.

== Mission ==
The Institute aims to promote fundamental research on the foundations of computer science, as well as to expand the horizons of the field by exploring other scientific disciplines through a computational lens. This second and distinctive goal is motivated by the fact that natural phenomena in many scientific fields (including mathematics, statistics, physics, astronomy, biology and economics), or the models those fields have developed for these phenomena, are intrinsically computational in nature—from chemical processes in living cells to the self-organizing behavior of complex systems of interacting particles, to mechanisms governing human evolution and the collective behavior of competing agents in an economy. The insights gained from such explorations often reflect back to the theory of computation, opening new directions and advancing our understanding of fundamental issues in complexity theory and algorithms.

== Activities ==
The Institute's core activities revolve around a rotating sequence of programs; a program typically runs for one semester, and there will usually be two concurrent programs each semester. Run by a small group of organizers, a program typically includes 60-70 long-term participants (a mix of senior and junior researchers), with additional short-term visitors attending workshops during the semester. Junior participants are supported by the Fellowships program.

Program topics are intended to span all areas of theoretical computer science, as well as its connections to other scientific disciplines; the Institute particularly aims to identify programs that can potentially lead to substantial advances in the field, rather than promoting "business as usual".

Semester	Program	Organizers
Spring 2024	Error-Correcting Codes: Theory and Practice	Sivakanth Gopi, Venkatesan Guruswami, Henry Pfister, Mary Wootters, Gilles Zémor
Spring 2024	Quantum Algorithms, Complexity, and Fault Tolerance	Anurag Anshu, Nikolas Breuckmann, Patrick Hayden, Sandy Irani, Urmila Mahadev, Umesh Vazirani
Summer 2024	Sublinear Algorithms	Clément Canonne, Artur Czumaj, Piotr Indyk, Jelani Nelson, Noga Ron-Zewi, Ronitt Rubinfeld, Asaf Shapira
Summer 2024	Summer Cluster: AI, Psychology, and Neuroscience	Shiry Ginosar, Justine Casselll, Alison Gopnik, Phillip Isola, Christos Papadimitriou, Amanda Seed, Antonio Torralba, Doris Tsao, Shimon Ullman
Summer 2024	Extended Reunion: Theoretical Foundations of Computer Systems	Ruzica Piskac, Moshe Vardi
