= Severe Tire Damage =

Severe Tire Damage may refer to:

- Signs warning of spike strips
- Severe Tire Damage (band), a rock band
- Severe Tire Damage (album) by They Might Be Giants
