= Impagliazzo =

Impagliazzo is a surname of Italian origin. It is derived from the Italian word impagliare, meaning to fill with straw. Notable individuals with the surname include:

- Marco Impagliazzo (born 1962), Italian historian and lecturer
- Russell Impagliazzo (born 1963), American computer scientist
