= Michael J. Fischer =

American computer scientist (born 1942)

Michael John Fischer (born 1942) is an American computer scientist who works in the fields of distributed computing, parallel computing, cryptography, algorithms and data structures, and computational complexity.

== Early life and education ==
Fischer was born in 1942 in Ann Arbor, Michigan, USA.

He received his B.S. degree in mathematics from the University of Michigan in 1963. Fischer did his M.A. and Ph.D. studies in applied mathematics at Harvard University; he received his M.A .degree in 1965 and Ph.D. in 1968. Fischer's Ph.D. supervisor at Harvard was Sheila Greibach.

== Career ==
After receiving his PhD, Fischer was an assistant professor of computer science at Carnegie Mellon University in 1968–1969, an assistant professor of mathematics at Massachusetts Institute of Technology (MIT) in 1969–1973, and an associate professor of electrical engineering at MIT in 1973–1975. At MIT he supervised doctoral students who became prominent computer scientists, including David S. Johnson, Frances Yao, and Michael Hammer.

In 1975, Fischer was nominated as a professor of computer science at the University of Washington. Since 1981, he has been a professor of computer science at Yale University, where his students included Rebecca N. Wright. Fischer served as the editor-in-chief of the Journal of the ACM in 1982–1986. He was inducted as a Fellow of the Association for Computing Machinery (ACM) in 1996.

== Work ==
=== Distributed computing ===
Fischer's 1985 work with Nancy A. Lynch and Michael S. Paterson on consensus problems received the PODC Influential-Paper Award in 2001. Their work showed that in an asynchronous distributed system, consensus is impossible if there is one processor that crashes. Jennifer L. Welch writes that “This result has had a monumental impact in distributed computing, both theory and practice. Systems designers were motivated to clarify their claims concerning under what circumstances the systems work.”

Fischer was the program chairman of the first Symposium on Principles of Distributed Computing (PODC) in 1982; nowadays, PODC is the leading conference in the field. In 2003, the distributed computing community honoured Fischer's 60th birthday by organising a lecture series during the 22nd PODC, with Leslie Lamport, Nancy Lynch, Albert R. Meyer, and Rebecca Wright as speakers.

=== Parallel computing ===
In 1980, Fischer and Richard E. Ladner presented a parallel algorithm for computing prefix sums efficiently. They show how to construct a circuit that computes the prefix sums; in the circuit, each node performs an addition of two numbers. With their construction, one can choose a trade-off between the circuit depth and the number of nodes. However, the same circuit designs were already studied much earlier by Soviet mathematicians.

=== Algorithms and computational complexity ===
Fischer has done multifaceted work in theoretical computer science in general. Fischer's early work, including his PhD thesis, focused on parsing and formal grammars. One of Fischer's most-cited works deals with string matching. Already during his years at Michigan, Fischer studied disjoint-set data structures together with Bernard Galler.

=== Cryptography ===
Fischer is one of the pioneers in electronic voting. In 1985, Fischer and his student Josh Cohen Benaloh presented one of the first electronic voting schemes.

Other contributions related to cryptography include the study of key exchange problems and a protocol for oblivious transfer. In 1984, Fischer, Silvio Micali, and Charles Rackoff presented an improved version of Michael O. Rabin's protocol for oblivious transfer.

== Publications ==
- Galler, Bernard A.; Fischer, Michael J. (1964). "An improved equivalence algorithm". Communications of the ACM. 7 (5): 301–303. doi:10.1145/364099.364331. S2CID 9034016..
- Wagner, Robert A.; Fischer, Michael J. (1974). "The string-to-string correction problem". Journal of the ACM. 21 (1): 168–173. doi:10.1145/321796.321811. S2CID 13381535..
- Ladner, Richard E.; Fischer, Michael J. (1980). "Parallel prefix computation". Journal of the ACM. 27 (4): 831–838. doi:10.1145/322217.322232. S2CID 207568668..
- Fischer, Michael J.; Lynch, Nancy A.; Paterson, Michael S. (1985). "Impossibility of distributed consensus with one faulty process". Journal of the ACM. 32 (2): 374–382. doi:10.1145/3149.214121. hdl:1721.1/149560. S2CID 207660233..
- Cohen, Josh D.; Fischer, Michael J. (1985). "A robust and verifiable cryptographically secure election scheme". 26th Annual Symposium on Foundations of Computer Science (sfcs 1985). pp. 372–382. doi:10.1109/SFCS.1985.2. ISBN 0-8186-0644-4..
- Fischer, M. J.; Micali, S.; Rackoff, C. (1996). "A secure protocol for the oblivious transfer (extended abstract)". Journal of Cryptology. 9 (3): 191–195. doi:10.1007/BF00208002. S2CID 6333850..
