= Harry Mairson =

- Education: Yale University; Stanford University
- Known for: type inference for the ML programming language Hindley–Milner type inference
- Scientific career
- Workplaces: Stanford University; Boston University; Brandeis University
- Thesis: The Program Complexity of Searching a Table (1983)
- Doctoral advisor: Jeffrey Ullman
- Website: https://www.cs.brandeis.edu/~mairson/

Harry George Mairson is a theoretical computer scientist and professor of computer science in the Volen National Center for Complex Systems at Brandeis University in Waltham, Massachusetts. His research is in the fields of logic in computer science, lambda calculus and functional programming, type theory and constructive mathematics, computational complexity theory, and algorithmics.

His Ph.D. thesis, The Program Complexity of Searching a Table, won the Machtey Award at the 1983 IEEE Symposium on Foundations of Computer Science (FOCS). Mairson was a Postdoctoral researcher at INRIA Rocqencourt from 1984 to 1985, at Stanford University in 1985, and at the University of Oxford in 1986. He held a visiting professor position from 1999 to 2001 at Boston University. From 2005 to 2007, Mairson has served as the chair of the Faculty Senate at Brandeis. He is currently an associate editor of the journal Logical Methods in Computer Science and Information and Computation, and sits on the editorial board of Higher-Order and Symbolic Computation.

Mairson's contributions to the theory of programming languages include proving that type inference for the ML programming language, so-called Hindley–Milner type inference, is complete for exponential time and that parallel beta reduction is non-elementary.

== Education ==
Mairson received a B.A. in mathematics from Yale University in 1978 and a Ph.D. in computer science from Stanford University in 1984 under the supervision of Jeffrey Ullman.
