= Jaikumar Radhakrishnan =

Indian computer scientist

- Born: 30 May 1964 (age 62)
- Education: IIT Kharagpur, Rutgers University
- Awards: Shanti Swarup Bhatnagar Prize for Science and Technology
- Scientific career
- Fields: combinatorics, communication complexity
- Workplaces: Tata Institute of Fundamental Research, Mumbai
- Doctoral advisor: Endre Szemerédi

Jaikumar Radhakrishnan (born 30 May 1964) is an Indian computer scientist specialising in combinatorics and communication complexity. He has served as dean of the School of Technology and Computer Science at the Tata Institute of Fundamental Research, Mumbai, India, where he is currently a senior professor.

He obtained his B.Tech. degree in Computer Science and Engineering from the Indian Institute of Technology, Kharagpur in 1985 and his Ph.D. in Theoretical Computer Science from Rutgers University, NJ, USA, in 1991 under the guidance of Endre Szemerédi. His first research paper, titled "Better Bounds for Threshold Formulas", won the Machtey Award for best student paper at the IEEE Symposium on Foundations of Computer Science (FOCS) in 1991. His areas of research include combinatorics, graph theory, probability theory, information theory, communication complexity, computational complexity theory, quantum computation and quantum information science.

He was awarded the Shanti Swarup Bhatnagar Prize for Science and Technology in the category of Mathematical Sciences in 2008, India's highest honour for excellence in science, mathematics and technology.

== Other awards/honours ==
- Fellow of the Indian Academy of Sciences, since 2007.
