= Anna Karlin =

American computer scientist

Anna R. Karlin
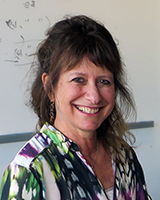
- Education: Stanford University (BS, PhD)
- Scientific career
- Fields: Computer science
- Workplaces: University of Washington
- Thesis: Sharing Memory in Distributed Systems - Methods and Application (1987)
- Doctoral advisor: Jeffrey Ullman
- Doctoral students: Frank McSherry
- Website: www.cs.washington.edu/people/faculty/karlin

Anna R. Karlin is an American computer scientist, the Microsoft Professor of Computer Science & Engineering at the University of Washington.

== Biography ==
Karlin was born into an academic family. Her father, Samuel Karlin, was a mathematician at Stanford University, and her brother, Kenneth Karlin, is a professor of chemistry at Johns Hopkins University.

Karlin went to Stanford for her undergraduate studies, receiving a bachelor's degree in 1981. She stayed at Stanford for graduate school, and earned Ph.D. in 1987 under the supervision of Jeffrey Ullman. She continued to work near Stanford, at the DEC Systems Research Center, for five years, before moving to the University of Washington in 1994. She was program chair of the IEEE Symposium on Foundations of Computer Science in 1997. Karlin now serves as the Associate Director of Graduate Studies and Bill & Melinda Gates Chair in Computer Science and Engineering at the University of Washington's Paul G. Allen School of Computer Science & Engineering.

Karlin was also one of the founding members of the rock music band Severe Tire Damage, and in 1993 as part of the band she participated in the first live music broadcast on the Internet.

== Research ==
Karlin's research interests are in the design and analysis of online algorithms and randomized algorithms, which she has applied to problems in algorithmic game theory, system software, distributed computing, and data mining. She has written heavily cited papers on the use of randomized packet markings to perform IP traceback, competitive analysis of multiprocessor cache coherence algorithms, unified algorithms for simultaneously managing all levels of the memory hierarchy, web proxy servers, and hash tables with constant worst-case lookup time.

== Awards and honors ==
In 2012, Karlin was named as a fellow of the Association for Computing Machinery. In 2016 she became a fellow of the American Academy of Arts and Sciences. She was awarded the 2020 ACM Paris Kanellakis Theory and Practice Award, "For the discovery and analysis of balanced allocations, known as the power of two choices, and their extensive applications to practice." She was elected to the National Academy of Sciences in 2021 and to the National Academy of Engineering in 2022.

== Selected publications ==
- Karlin, Anna R.; Manasse, Mark S.; Rudolph, Larry; Sleator, Daniel D. (1988), "Competitive snoopy caching", Algorithmica, 3 (1): 79–119, doi:10.1007/BF01762111, MR 0925479.
- Dietzfelbinger, Martin; Karlin, Anna; Mehlhorn, Kurt; Meyer auf der Heide, Friedhelm; Rohnert, Hans; Tarjan, Robert E. (1994), "Dynamic perfect hashing: upper and lower bounds", SIAM Journal on Computing, 23 (4): 738–761, doi:10.1137/S0097539791194094, MR 1283572.
- Feeley, M. J.; Morgan, W. E.; Pighin, E. P.; Karlin, A. R.; Levy, H. M.; Thekkath, C. A. (1995), "Implementing global memory management in a workstation cluster", Proceedings of the 15th ACM Symposium on Operating Systems Principles (SOSP '95), pp. 201–212, doi:10.1145/224056.224072, ISBN 978-0897917155.
- Wolman, Alec; Voelker, M.; Sharma, Nitin; Cardwell, Neal; Karlin, Anna; Levy, Henry M. (1999), "On the scale and performance of cooperative Web proxy caching", Proceedings of the 17th ACM Symposium on Operating Systems Principles (SOSP '99), pp. 16–31, CiteSeerX 10.1.1.74.7126, doi:10.1145/319151.319153, ISBN 978-1581131406.
- Savage, Stefan; Wetherall, David; Karlin, Anna; Anderson, Tom (2000), "Practical network support for IP traceback", Proceedings of the conference on Applications, Technologies, Architectures, and Protocols for Computer Communication (SIGCOMM '00) (PDF), pp. 295–306, doi:10.1145/347059.347560, ISBN 978-1581132236.
- Savage, Stefan; Wetherall, David; Karlin, Anna; Anderson, Tom (2001), "Network support for IP traceback", IEEE/ACM Transactions on Networking, 9 (3): 226–237, doi:10.1109/90.929847.
- Karlin, Anna; Peres, Yuval (2017), Game Theory, Alive, Providence, Rhode Island: American Mathematical Society.
