= Lawrence Schulman =

American-Israeli physicist (born 1941)

Lawrence S. Schulman
- Born: 1941 (age 84–85)
- Citizenship: United States
- Known for: Boltzmann's brain Measurement problem Arrow of time
- Scientific career
- Fields: Physics
- Workplaces: Yeshiva University; Princeton University; Indiana University (Bloomington); Technion – Israel Institute of Technology; Clarkson University; Georgia Institute of Technology
- Thesis: A path integral for spin (1967)
- Doctoral advisor: Arthur Wightman

Lawrence S. Schulman (born 1941) is an American-Israeli physicist known for his work on path integrals, quantum measurement theory and statistical mechanics. He introduced topology into path integrals on multiply connected spaces and has contributed to diverse areas from galactic morphology to the arrow of time.

== Early life and education ==
He was born to Anna and Louis Schulman in Newark, New Jersey. He first went to the local public school, but switched to more Jewish oriented institutions, graduating from Yeshiva University in 1963. While still in college he married Claire Frangles Sherman. From Yeshiva he went to Princeton where he received the Ph.D. in physics for his thesis (under Arthur Wightman) A path integral for spin.

== Career ==
After completing his thesis he took a position as Assistant Professor at Indiana University (Bloomington), but in 1970 went to the Technion-Israel Institute of Technology in Haifa on a NATO postdoctoral fellowship.

At the Technion he accepted a position as Associate Professor, but only resigned from Indiana several years later as professor. In 1985, he returned to the United States as Chair of the Physics Department of Clarkson University and eventually (1988) also resigned from the Technion as a full professor. In 1991, he left the chair-ship and since then has stayed on at Clarkson as professor of physics.

In 2013, he spent part of a sabbatical at Georgia Institute of Technology and has since been adjunct professor at that institution.

Together with Phil Seiden of IBM, he began the first studies of randomized cellular automata, an area that morphed into a theory of star formation in galaxies, once they were joined by Humberto Gerola (an astrophysicist at IBM) who realized that star formation regions - as well as epidemic models- could be viewed as random cellular automata. Besides providing an explanation for spiral arms, this work ultimately solved the mystery of why dwarf galaxies can vary in their luminosity by large factors.

In 1981, Schulman published Techniques and Applications of Path Integration, from which many physicists learned about Feynman's path integral and its many applications. The book went on to become a Wiley classic and in 2005 came out in a Dover edition (with a supplement).

Once Schulman proved that there was no infinite cluster for long-range percolation in one dimension for sufficiently small but non-zero connection probability, it became of interest whether for sufficiently large connection probability there was an infinite cluster. Together with Charles Newman, then of the University of Arizona. They used real-space renormalization methods to prove that there was.

Schulman lowered his Erdös number to two by collaborating with Mark Kac and others on Feynman's checkerboard path integral, realizing that a particle only acquires mass by scattering, reversing its speed-of-light propagation. Later the path to Erdös was reinforced by another collaboration, with his son Leonard, whose Erdös number is also one.

Quantum measurement had always seemed an oxymoron and in the 1980s Schulman conceived of a way to retain unitary time evolution while at the same time having a single "world" (in the sense of the many worlds interpretation). So measurements in quantum mechanics could yield definite results. The mechanism for achieving definite outcomes was the use of "special states" in which pure unitary evolution led to only a single outcome, when in the absence of special initial conditions many outcomes were conceivable. The need for those states at all times led to an examination of the arrow of time and of determinism (achieved here, but in a way that might have surprised Einstein, at least according to his collaborator - and Schulman's Technion colleague - Nathan Rosen).

These ideas have not been accepted in the mainstream of physics and Schulman himself has expressed doubts about them - his claim though is that other ideas on the quantum measurement process are even less believable. As of 1997, the work was summarized in a book, Time's arrows and quantum measurement. Despite the apparent finality of book publication, more than a decade later practical experimental tests of these ideas were conceived and published.

The arrow of time, of significance in the measurement problem, became a topic in and of itself. This goes back to Schulman's attempt to understand the Wheeler-Feynman absorber theory. Using similar tools he was able to demonstrate that two systems with opposite arrows of time could coexist, even with mild contact between them. There was also examination of other ideas on the arrow, including Thomas Gold's contribution (relating the thermodynamic arrow to the expansion of the universe) and a critique of Boltzmann's notions (now known as Boltzmann's Brain) as a form of solipsism. See Schulman's critique on page 154 of.

Schulman was interested in the quantum Zeno effect, the deviation from exponential decay for short times. He predicted that the slowdown in decay that occurred in pulsed observation and the slowdown resulting from continuous measurement would differ by a factor of 4. This was verified on Bose-Einstein condensates by a group at MIT.

Schulman has also contributed to practical matters through his collaboration with a group in Prague interested in luminescence and scintillators. This was first realized in a study anomalous decay caused by KAM tori in phase space (and the associated data fits) and more recently has led to studies of quantum tunneling. When funds were available undergraduate students from Clarkson were sent to Prague to work in the optical materials laboratories.

Together with Bernard Gaveau (University of Paris VI) Schulman developed an embedding of a stochastic dynamical system in low dimensional Euclidean space, known as the "observable representation." This has proved useful in numerous areas from spin-glasses to ecology.

In 2005, he was awarded a Gutwiller fellowship from the Max Planck Institute for the Physics of Complex Systems in Dresden.

In 2022 he published another book, "When things grow many: Complexity, universality and emergence". This is mainly a teaching tool.

== Personal life ==
He is the father of Leonard Schulman, Computer Science professor at the California Institute of Technology, Linda Parmet, Hebrew and Creative Design teacher at The Weber School, and David Schulman, an intellectual property attorney at Greenberg Traurig, one of the nation's largest law firms.
