= Knuth Prize =

Prize in foundations of computer science

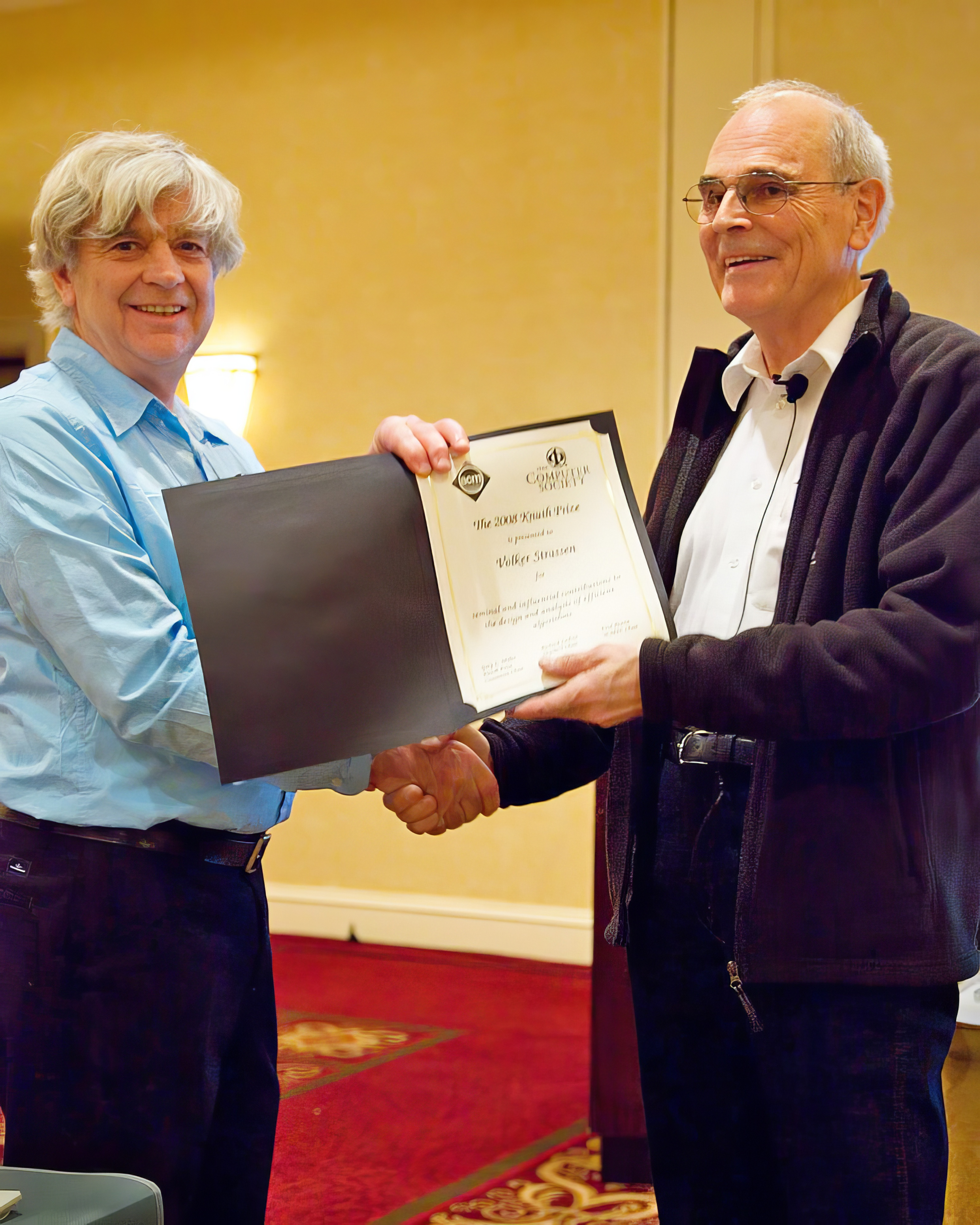
Gary Miller presents Volker Strassen with the 2008 Knuth Prize at SODA 2009.

The Donald E. Knuth Prize is a prize for outstanding contributions to the foundations of computer science, named after the American computer scientist Donald E. Knuth.

== History ==
The Knuth Prize has been awarded since 1996 and includes an award of US$5,000. The prize is awarded by ACM SIGACT and by IEEE Computer Society's Technical Committee on the Mathematical Foundations of Computing. Prizes are awarded in alternating years at the ACM Symposium on Theory of Computing and at the IEEE Symposium on Foundations of Computer Science, which are among the most prestigious conferences in theoretical computer science. The recipient of the Knuth Prize delivers a lecture at the conference. For instance, David S. Johnson "used his Knuth Prize lecture to push for practical applications for algorithms."

In contrast with the Gödel Prize, which recognizes outstanding papers, the Knuth Prize is awarded to individuals for their overall impact in the field.

== Winners ==
Since the prize was instituted in 1996, it has been awarded to the following individuals, with the citation for each award quoted (not always in full):

Year	Laureate	Citation
1996	Andrew Yao	"fundamental research in computational complexity"
1997	Leslie Valiant	"far-reaching contributions to the study of computational complexity, parallel computation, and learning theory"
1999	László Lovász	"enormous influence on the theory of algorithms" and "fundamental discoveries that have became standard tools in theoretical computer science"
2000	Jeffrey Ullman	"sustained research contributions to Theoretical Computer Science, especially as it relates to applied areas of Computer Science such as compilers, parallelism, and databases; and for his contributions to Theoretical Computer Science education through textbooks and the mentoring of graduate students"
2002	Christos Papadimitriou	"for longstanding and seminal contributions to the foundations of computer science"
2003	Miklós Ajtai	"for numerous ground-breaking contributions to Theoretical Computer Science"
2005	Mihalis Yannakakis	"for numerous ground-breaking contributions to Theoretical Computer Science"
2007	Nancy Lynch	"for seminal and influential contributions to the theory of distributed computing"
2008	Volker Strassen	"for his seminal and influential contributions to efficient algorithms"
2010	David Johnson	"for his contributions to theoretical and experimental analysis of algorithms"
2011	Ravi Kannan	"provided theoretical computer science with many powerful new algorithmic techniques"
2012	Leonid Levin	"in recognition of four decades of visionary research in complexity, cryptography, and information theory"
2013	Gary Miller	"major impact on cryptography as well as number theory, parallel computing, graph theory, mesh generation for scientific computing, and linear system solving"
2014	Richard Lipton	"for inventing new computer science and mathematical techniques to tackle foundational and practical problems in a wide range of areas in graph algorithms, computaiton, communication, program testing, and DNA computing"
2015	László Babai	"for his fundamental contributions to theoretical computer science, including algorithm design and complexity theory"
2016	Noam Nisan	"for fundamental and lasting contributions to theoretical computer science in areas including communication complexity, pseudo-random number generators, interactive proofs, and algorithmic game theory"
2017	Oded Goldreich	"for fundamental and lasting contributions to theoretical computer science in many areas including cryptography, randomness, probabilistically checkable proofs, inapproximability, property testing as well as complexity theory in general"
2018	Johan Håstad	"for his long and sustained record of milestone breakthroughs at the foundations of computer science, with huge impact on many areas including optimization, cryptography, parallel computing, and complexity theory"
2019	Avi Wigderson	"for fundamental and lasting contributions to the foundations of computer science in areas including randomized computation, cryptography, circuit complexity, proof complexity, parallel computation, and our understanding of fundamental graph properties"
2020	Cynthia Dwork	"for fundamental and lasting contributions to computer science. Dwork is one of the most influential theoretical computer scientists of her generation. Her research has transformed several fields, most notably distributed systems, cryptography, and data privacy, and her current work promises to add fairness in algorithmic decision making to the list."
2021	Moshe Vardi	"for outstanding contributions that apply mathematical logic to multiple fundamental areas of computer science"
2022	Noga Alon	"for foundational contributions in combinatorics and graph theory and applications to fundamental topics in computer science"
2023	Éva Tardos	for "her extensive research contributions and field leadership, namely co-authoring an influential textbook, Algorithm Design, co-editing the Handbook of Game Theory, serving as editor-in-chief of the Journal of the ACM and the Society for Industrial and Applied Mathematics (SIAM) Journal of Computing and chairing program committees for several leading field conferences"
2024	Rajeev Alur	for "outstanding contributions to the foundations of computer science for his introduction of novel models of computation which provide the theoretical foundations for analysis, design, synthesis, and verification of computer systems"
2025	Micha Sharir	for "seminal contributions to computational and discrete geometry, the development of algorithmic motion planning, transforming the field of computational geometry, and inspiring generations of researchers"
2026	Moni Naor	for work that "ranges across cryptography, pseudorandomness, algorithms, databases, and distributed computing"

== Selection Committees ==
Year	Selection Committee
1996	Ronald Graham (Chair AT&T Research), Joseph Halpern (IBM Almaden Research Center), Kurt Mehlhorn (Max-Planck-Institut für Informatik), Nicholas Pippenger (University of British Columbia), Éva Tardos (Cornell University), Avi Wigderson (Hebrew University)
1997	
1999	Allan Borodin, Ashok Chandra, Herbert Edelsbrunner, Christos Papadimitriou, Éva Tardos (chair), and Avi Wigderson
2000	
2002	
2003	
2005	Richard Ladner, Tom Leighton, László Lovász, Gary Miller, Mike Paterson and Umesh Vazirani (chair)
2007	Mike Paterson (Chair), Tom Leighton, Gary Miller, Anne Condon, Mihalis Yannakakis, Richard Ladner
2008	
2010	
2011	
2012	
2013	
2014	
2015	Russell Impagliazzo (Chair, UCSD), Uriel Feige (The Weizmann Institute of Science), Michel Goemans (MIT), Johan Håstad (KTH Royal Institute of Technology), Anna Karlin (U. of Washington), Satish Rao (UC Berkeley)
2016	Allan Borodin (U. Toronto), Uriel Feige (Weizmann Institute), Michel Goemans (MIT, chair), Johan Håstad (KTH), Satish Rao (UC Berkeley) and Shang-Hua Teng (USC).
2017	Allan Borodin (Chair, U. of Toronto), Avrim Blum (CMU), Shafi Goldwasser (MIT and Weizmann Institute), Johan Håstad (KTH – Royal Institute of Technology), Satish Rao (UC Berkeley), and Shang-Hua Teng (USC)
2018	Allan Borodin (U. of Toronto), Alan Frieze (CMU), Avrim Blum (TTIC), Shafi Goldwasser (UC Berkeley), Noam Nisan (Hebrew U.) and Shang-Hua Teng (Chair, USC)
2019	Avrim Blum (Chair, TTIC), Alan Frieze (CMU), Shafi Goldwasser (UC Berkeley), Noam Nisan (Hebrew U.), Ronitt Rubinfeld (MIT and Tel Aviv U.), and Andrew Yao (Tsinghua U.).
2020	Alan Frieze, (Chair, CMU), Harold Gabow (U. of Colorado), Noam Nisan (Hebrew U.), Ronitt Rubinfeld (MIT), Éva Tardos (Cornell U.), Andrew Yao (Tsinghua U.)
2021	Harold Gabow (Chair, U. Colorado), Noam Nisan (Hebrew U.), Dana Randall (Georgia Tech), Ronitt Rubinfeld (MIT), Madhu Sudan (Harvard U.), and Andrew Yao (Tsinghua U.)
2022	Harold Gabow (U. Colorado), Monika Henzinger (U. Vienna), Kurt Mehlhorn (Max Planck Institute), Dana Randall (Chair, Georgia Tech), Madhu Sudan (Harvard U.), and Andrew Yao (Tsinghua U.)
2023	David Eppstein (UC Irvine), Monika Henzinger (Chair, ISTA/U. Vienna), Kurt Mehlhorn (Max Planck Institute), Dana Randall (Georgia Tech), Madhu Sudan (Harvard U.), and Moshe Vardi (Rice U.)
2024	Edith Cohen (Google/Tel Aviv U.), David Eppstein (Chair, UC Irvine), Monika Henzinger (IST Austria), Kurt Mehlhorn (Max Planck Institute), Salil Vadhan (Harvard U.), and Moshe Vardi (Rice U.)
2025	Noga Alon (Princeton), Edith Cohen (Chair, Google/Tel Aviv U.), David Eppstein (UC Irvine), Valerie King (U. of Victoria), Salil Vadhan (Harvard U.), Moshe Vardi (Rice U.)
2026	Noga Alon (Princeton), Edith Cohen (Chair, Google/Tel Aviv U.), Yael Tauman Kalai (MIT), Sampath Kannan (Univ. Penn.), Valerie King (U. of Victoria), Salil Vadhan (Harvard U.)

== See also ==
- List of computer science awards
