= Mike Paterson =

British computer scientist

- Born: 1942 (age 83–84)
- Education: Ph.D., University of Cambridge (1967)
- Known for: Algorithms, complexity
- Awards: Dijkstra Prize (2001); EATCS Award (2006)
- Scientific career
- Fields: Computer science
- Institutions: Massachusetts Institute of Technology; University of Warwick
- Thesis: Equivalence Problems in a Model of Computation (1967)
- Doctoral advisor: David Park
- Doctoral students: Leslie Valiant

Michael Stewart Paterson, is a British computer scientist, who was the director of the Centre for Discrete Mathematics and its Applications (DIMAP) at the University of Warwick until 2007, and chair of the department of computer science in 2005.

He received his Doctor of Philosophy (Ph.D.) from the University of Cambridge in 1967, under the supervision of David Park. He spent three years at the Massachusetts Institute of Technology (MIT) and moved to the University of Warwick in 1971, where he remains Professor Emeritus.

Paterson is an expert on theoretical computer science with more than 100 publications, especially in the design and analysis of algorithms and computational complexity. Paterson's distinguished career was recognised with the EATCS Award in 2006, and a workshop in honour of his 66th birthday in 2008, including contributions of several Turing Award and Gödel Prize laureates. A further workshop was held in 2017 in honour of his 75th birthday, co-located with the workshop for the 10th anniversary of the DIMAP centre. For his work on distributed computing with Fischer and Lynch, he received the Dijkstra Prize in 2001, and his work with Dyer and Goldberg on counting graph homomorphisms received the best paper award at the ICALP conference in 2006. Mike Paterson received a Lester R. Ford Award in 2010. He is a Fellow of the Royal Society since 2001 and been president of the European Association for Theoretical Computer Science (EATCS). According to EATCS president Maurice Nivat, Paterson played a great role in the late 1960s in the recognition of computer science as a science, "and that theoretical computer science, which is very close to mathematics but distinct in its motivation and inspiration, is indeed a challenging and fruitful field of research."

Paterson is also an enthusiastic mountaineer.

== Selected publications ==
- M. Dyer, L.A. Goldberg and M. Paterson, On counting homomorphisms to directed acyclic graphs, Electronic Colloquium on Computational Complexity, Report TR05-121, Oct 2005.
- L.A. Goldberg, M. Jalsenius, R. Martin and M. Paterson, Improved mixing bounds for the anti-ferromagnetic Potts Model on Z^{2}, LMS J. Comput. Math. 9 (2006) 1–20.
- L.A. Goldberg, R. Martin and M. Paterson, Strong spatial mixing for lattice graphs with fewer colours, SICOMP, 35(2) 486–517 (2005).
- M. Albert and M. Paterson, Bounds for the growth rate of meander numbers, Proceedings of the 16th Annual International Conference on Formal Power Series and Algebraic Combinatorics, 2004, University of British Columbia (Vancouver B.C., Canada).
- L.A. Goldberg, M. Jerrum, S. Kannan and M. Paterson, A bound on the capacity of backoff and acknowledgement-based protocols, SICOMP, 88 (2004) 313–331.
- M. Adler, P. Berenbrink, T. Friedetzky, L.A. Goldberg, P. Goldberg and M. Paterson, A proportionate fair scheduling rule with good worst-case performance, Proc. of the 15th Annual ACM Symposium on Parallel Algorithms and Architectures (SPAA 2003), 101–108 (2003).
- L.A. Goldberg, M. Jerrum and M. Paterson, The computational complexity of two-state spin systems, Random Structures and Algorithms, 23(2) 133–154 (2003).
- K. Iwama, A. Matsuura and M. Paterson, A family of NFAs which need 2^{n}-alpha deterministic states, Theoretical Computer Science 301(1–3), 451–462 (2003).
- L.A. Goldberg, S. Kelk and M. Paterson, The complexity of choosing an H-colouring (nearly) uniformly at random, SICOMP, 33(2) 416–432 (2004) copyright SIAM.
- M. Paterson, H. Schroeder, O. Sykora and I. Vrto, On permutation communications in all-optical rings, Parallel Processing Letters 12(1), 23–29 (2002).

== See also ==
- Paterson's worms
- Sprouts (game)
