= Leonard Schulman =

American mathematician

- Born: September 14, 1963 (age 62); Princeton, New Jersey
- Education: Massachusetts Institute of Technology
- Known for: Algorithms, information theory, coding theory, quantum computation
- Scientific career
- Fields: Computer science, applied mathematics
- Workplaces: California Institute of Technology
- Doctoral advisor: Michael Sipser

Leonard J. Y. Schulman (born September 14, 1963) is professor of computer science in the Computing and Mathematical Sciences Department at the California Institute of Technology. He is known for work on algorithms, information theory, coding theory, and quantum computation.

== Personal biography ==
Schulman is the son of theoretical physicist Lawrence Schulman.

== Academic biography ==
Schulman studied at the Massachusetts Institute of Technology, where he completed a BS degree in mathematics in 1988 and a PhD degree in applied mathematics in 1992. He was a faculty member in the College of Computing at the Georgia Institute of Technology from 1995 to 2000 before joining the faculty of the California Institute of Technology. From 2003-2017, he served as the director of the Center for Mathematics of Information at Caltech. He also participates in the Institute for Quantum Information and Matter. In 2017-2018, he was a EURIAS Senior Fellow at the Israel Institute for Advanced Studies at the Hebrew University in Jerusalem.

== Research ==
Schulman's research centers broadly around algorithms and information. He has made notable contributions to varied areas within this space including clustering, derandomization, quantum information theory, and coding theory. In coding theory he proved the Interactive Coding Theorem (a generalization of the Shannon Coding Theorem.) In clustering, his work on quantifying the effectiveness of Lloyd-type methods for the k-means problem, was named a Computing Reviews "Notable Paper" in 2012. In quantum computation, he is known for his work on the non-abelian hidden subgroup problem, and for his work on noise thresholds for ensemble quantum computing.

== Awards and honors ==
Schulman received the MIT Bucsela Prize in 1988, an NSF Mathematical Sciences Postdoctoral Fellowship in 1992 and an NSF CAREER award in 1999. His work received the IEEE S.A. Schelkunoff Prize in 2005. Schulman was also recognized for the ACM Notable Paper in 2012. In 2022 he was awarded the FOCS Test of Time Award for his work on error correction in the setting of interactive communication. He was the editor-in-chief of the SIAM Journal on Computing for two terms (2013-2018.) He was elected as a Fellow of the Society for Industrial and Applied Mathematics, in the 2022 Class of SIAM Fellows, "for seminal contributions to coding theory, quantum computing and matrix analysis, and outstanding service".
