= Urmila Mahadev =

American mathematician

Urmila Mahadev is an American mathematician and theoretical computer scientist known for her work in quantum computing and quantum cryptography.

== Education and career ==
Mahadev is originally from Los Angeles, California, where her parents are physicians. She became interested in quantum computing through a course with Leonard Adleman at the University of Southern California, where she graduated in 2010.

She went to the University of California, Berkeley for graduate study, supported by a National Science Foundation Graduate Research Fellowship. As a student of Umesh Vazirani at Berkeley, Mahadev discovered interactive proof systems that could demonstrate with high certainty, to an observer using only classical computation, that a quantum computer has correctly performed a desired quantum-computing task.

She completed her Ph.D. in 2018, and after continued postdoctoral research at Berkeley, she became an assistant professor of computing and mathematical sciences at the California Institute of Technology.

== Recognition ==
For her work on quantum verification, Mahadev won the Machtey Award at the Symposium on Foundations of Computer Science in 2018, and in 2021 one of the three inaugural Maryam Mirzakhani New Frontiers Prizes for early-career achievements by women mathematicians.
