= David Park (computer scientist) =

British computer scientist

- Born: 1935
- Died: 29 September 1990 (aged 54–55); Warwick, United Kingdom
- Citizenship: United Kingdom
- Education: University of Oxford; Massachusetts Institute of Technology
- Known for: Lisp; Bisimulation
- Scientific career
- Fields: Mathematics; Computer science
- Workplaces: Massachusetts Institute of Technology; University of Cambridge; University of Warwick
- Thesis: Set-Theoretic Constructions in Model Theory (1964)
- Doctoral advisor: Hartley Rogers Jr.
- Doctoral students: Mike Paterson

David Michael Ritchie Park (1935 – 29 September 1990) was a British computer scientist. He worked on the first implementation of the programming language Lisp. He became an authority on the topics of fairness, program schemas and bisimulation in concurrent computing. At the University of Warwick, he was one of the earliest members of the computer science department, and served as chairperson.
