= Severe Tire Damage (band) =

American band

The band's logo

Severe Tire Damage was an American rock and roll "garage" band from Palo Alto, California, United States.

== Significance ==
Severe Tire Damage was the first band to perform live on the Internet. On June 24, 1993, the band was playing a gig at Xerox PARC while elsewhere in the building, scientists were discussing new technology (the MBone) for broadcasting on the Internet using livestreaming (known as multicasting at the time). The band was thus broadcast and could be seen live in Australia and other places.

On Friday, November 18, 1994, the Rolling Stones decided to broadcast one of their concert tours on the Internet. Before their broadcast, Severe Tire Damage returned to the Internet, this time becoming the "opening act" for the Stones. This performance gained significantly more publicity, and Severe Tire Damage was elevated to Warholian fame.

Newsweek magazine described Severe Tire Damage as being "a lesser known rock band." The Rolling Stones told The New York Times: "the surprise opening act by Severe Tire Damage was a good reminder of the democratic nature of the Internet."

== Band members ==
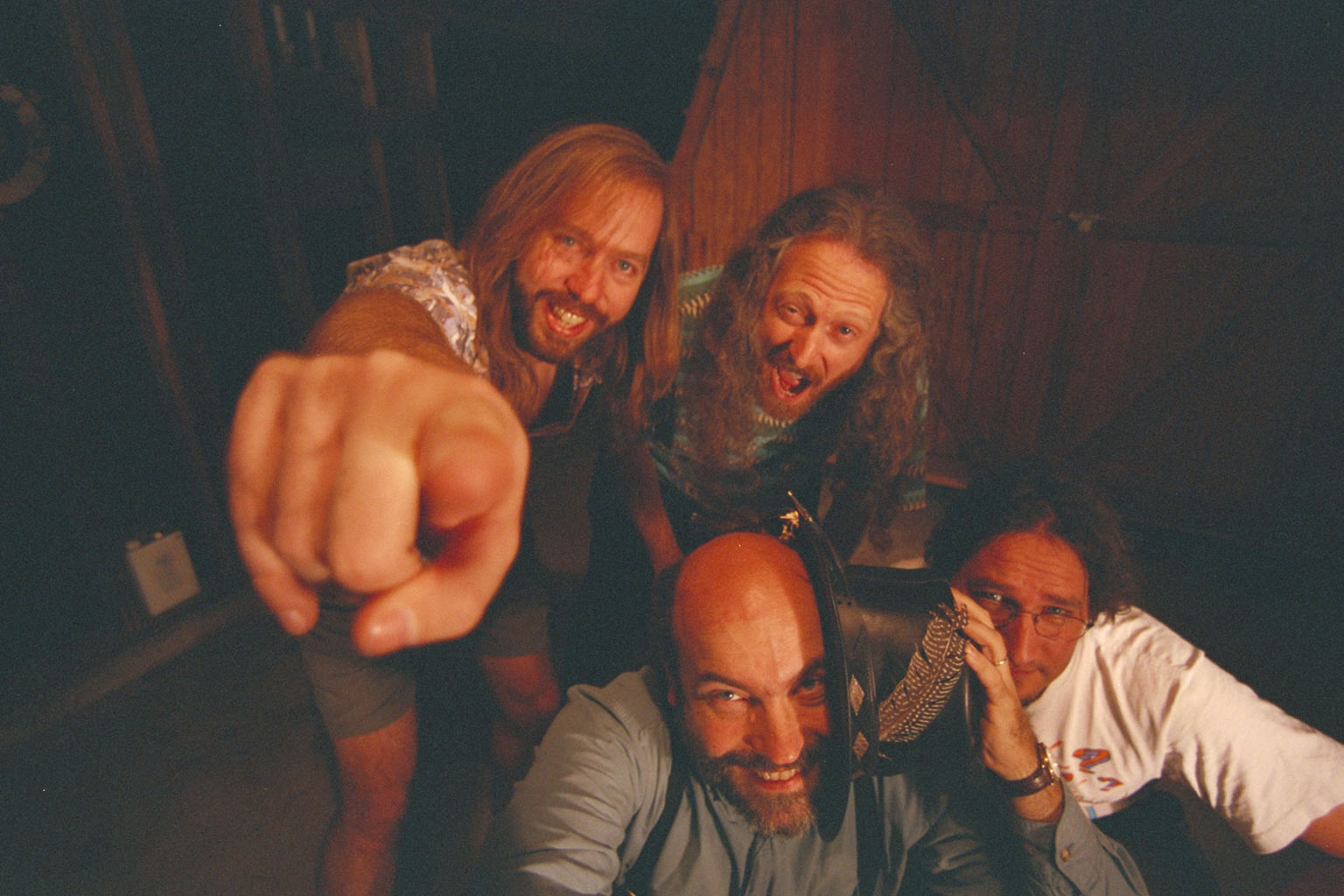
Severe Tire Damage band members

The core band consisted of these people:

- Russ Haines: guitar and vocals. Haines worked at DEC Systems Research Center.
- Mark Manasse: bass and vocals. Manasse worked at DEC Systems Research Center.
- Steven Rubin: vocals. Rubin worked at Apple Computer.
- Mark Weiser: drums. Weiser was Chief Technologist at Xerox PARC.

Additional people came and went during the band's history:

- Ken Beckman: drums. Beckman worked at DEC Systems Research Center.
- Lance Berc: tech. support. Berc worked at DEC Systems Research Center.
- Bruce Donald: guitar. Donald was a professor at Cornell University.
- Hania Gajewska: band manager. Gajewska worked at DEC Systems Research Center.
- Brad Horak: Tech. support. Horak worked at DEC Systems Research Center.
- Joel Jewitt: Drums.
- Anna Karlin: guitar and vocals. Karlin worked at DEC Systems Research Center and later became a professor at the University of Washington.
- Berry Kercheval: Bass, tech. support. Kercheval worked at Xerox PARC.
- Dexter Kozen: guitar, composer. Kozen was a professor at Cornell University.
- Amy Lansky: vocals. Lansky worked at NASA Ames.
- Ethan Robertson: sax and keyboards.
- Daniel Scharstein: keyboards and drums. Scharstein was a student at Cornell University.

== Music ==
Severe Tire Damage wrote a number of original songs in multiple genres, primarily rock and punk. They were released on the band's albums "Who Cares" (a full CD album) and "Trial Starter Kit" (a mini-CD with only 4 songs). Both albums were re-released on their collection CD "The Best We Can Do."

== Downfall ==
On April 27, 1999, Weiser died. The band had other drummers for a while, but it never fully recovered.
