= Shang-Hua Teng =

Chinese-American computer scientist

- Born: 1964 (age 61–62); China
- Education: Shanghai Jiao Tong University (BA, BS); University of Southern California (MS); Carnegie Mellon University (PhD)
- Known for: smoothed analysis of algorithms
- Awards: Gödel Prize (2008, 2015), Fulkerson Prize (2009)
- Scientific career
- Fields: Computer Science
- Workplaces: University of Southern California; University of Illinois at Urbana-Champaign; Boston University; University of Minnesota; Massachusetts Institute of Technology
- Thesis: A Unified Geometric Approach to Graph Partitioning (1991)
- Doctoral advisor: Gary Miller

Shang-Hua Teng (Chinese: 滕尚华; pinyin: Téng Shànghuá; born 1964) is a Chinese-American computer scientist. He is the Seeley G. Mudd Professor of Computer Science and Mathematics at the University of Southern California. Previously, he was the chairman of the Computer Science Department at the Viterbi School of Engineering of the University of Southern California.

== Biography ==
Teng was born in China in 1964. His father, Dr. Teng Zhanhong, was a professor of civil engineering at the Taiyuan University of Technology. His mother, Li Guixin, was an administrator at the same university.

Teng graduated with BA in electrical engineering and BS in computer science, both from Shanghai Jiao Tong University in 1985. He obtained MS in computer science from the University of Southern California in 1988. Teng holds a Ph.D. in computer science from Carnegie Mellon University (in 1991).

Prior to joining USC in 2009, Teng was a professor at Boston University. He has also taught at MIT, the University of Minnesota, and the University of Illinois at Urbana-Champaign. He has worked at Xerox PARC, NASA Ames Research Center, Intel Corporation, IBM Almaden Research Center, Akamai Technologies, Microsoft Research Redmond, Microsoft Research New England and Microsoft Research Asia.

== Recognition ==
In 2008 Teng was awarded the Gödel Prize for his joint work on smoothed analysis of algorithms with Daniel Spielman. They went to win the prize again in 2015 for their contribution on "nearly-linear-time Laplacian solvers". In 2009, he received the Fulkerson Prize given by the American Mathematical Society and the Mathematical Programming Society.

Teng is a Fellow of the Association for Computing Machinery (ACM) as well as an Alfred P. Sloan Research Fellow. He was named a SIAM Fellow in the 2021 class of fellows, "for contributions to scalable algorithm design, mesh generation, and algorithmic game theory, and for pioneering smoothed analysis of linear programming".

== Personal life ==
In 2003, Teng married Diana Irene Williams, then a Ph.D. student of history at Harvard University. They have a daughter.
