= Charles Rackoff =

American computer scientist

- Born: 26 November 1948 (age 77); New York City
- Education: Massachusetts Institute of Technology
- Awards: Gödel Prize (1993)
- Scientific career
- Fields: Cryptology
- Workplaces: University of Toronto
- Doctoral students: Richard Cleve

Charles Weill Rackoff is an American cryptologist and professor of computer science at the University of Toronto Mississauga. His research is in computational complexity theory, cryptography and security protocols.

Born and raised in New York City, he attended MIT as both an undergraduate and graduate student, and earned a Ph.D. degree in Computer Science in 1974. He spent a year as a postdoctoral scholar at INRIA in France.

In 1988, he collaborated with Michael Luby in a widely cited analysis of the Feistel cipher construction (one important result shown there is the construction of a strongly pseudo random permutation generator from a pseudo random function generator).

Rackoff, Shafi Goldwasser, and Silvio Micali collaborated in the 1980s on the invention of interactive proof systems, where a proof could be developed by answering a series of interactive questions between different participants. They also defined the concept of zero-knowledge proofs, a type of interactive proof where no knowledge is shared when proving a proof except the fact of whether the proof is correct. They published their work around the same time that László Babai and Shlomo Moran concurrently invented interactive proofs. Rackoff and the other four researchers were co-awarded the 1993 Gödel Prize for this work. In 2011, he won the RSA Award for Excellence in Mathematics for his various contributions to cryptography.

Rackoff's controversial comments on the 2000 memorial for the victims of the Montreal Massacre were reported in the Canadian media.

== Selected publications ==
- S. Goldwasser, S. Micali and C. Rackoff, "The knowledge complexity of interactive proof systems", SIAM Journal on Computing, 18, 1989, pp. 186–208.
- C. Rackoff and D. Simon, "Non-interactive zero-knowledge proof of knowledge and the chosen cipertext attack", in Proceedings of Crypto 91, pp. 433–444.
- C. Rackoff and D. Simon, "Cryptographic defense against traffic analysis", in Proceedings of the 25th ACM Symposium on Theory of Computing, May 1993, pp. 672–681.
