= David Zuckerman (computer scientist) =

American theoretical computer scientist

- Education: University of California at Berkeley; Harvard University
- Known for: Pseudorandomness
- Awards: ACM Fellow (2013); Simons Investigator (2016); Gödel Prize (2025)
- Scientific career
- Fields: Theoretical computer science
- Workplaces: University of Texas at Austin
- Thesis: Computing Efficiently Using General Weak Random Sources (1991)
- Doctoral advisor: Umesh Vazirani

David Zuckerman is an American theoretical computer scientist whose work concerns randomness in computation. He is a professor of computer science at the University of Texas at Austin.

== Biography ==
Zuckerman received an A.B. in mathematics from Harvard University in 1987, where he was a Putnam Fellow in 1986. He went on to earn a Ph.D. in computer science from the University of California at Berkeley in 1991 advised by Umesh Vazirani. He then worked as a postdoctoral fellow at the Massachusetts Institute of Technology and Hebrew University of Jerusalem before joining the University of Texas in 1994. Zuckerman was named a Fellow of the ACM in 2013, and a Simons Investigator in 2016.

== Research ==
Most of Zuckerman's work concerns randomness in computation, and especially pseudorandomness. He has written over 80 papers on topics including randomness extractors, pseudorandom generators, coding theory, and cryptography. Zuckerman is best known for his work on randomness extractors. In 2015 Zuckerman and his student Eshan Chattopadhyay solved an important open problem in the area by giving the first explicit construction of two-source extractors. The resulting paper won a best-paper award at the 2016 ACM Symposium on Theory of Computing, and in 2025, the Gödel Prize.
