= Marek Chrobak =

Professor

Marek Chrobak is a full professor at University of California, Riverside. He is known for his work competitive analysis of online algorithms, particularly for the k-server problem, on information dissemination in ad-hoc radio networks, and on graph drawing.

In automata theory, Chrobak is known for his contributions to the study of finite automata over a one-letter alphabet. In particular, "Chrobak normal form" for nondeterministic finite automata is known.

Chrobak obtained his PhD in Computer Science from Warsaw University in 1985.
