= Applied Mathematics Letters =

Scientific journal

- Discipline: Applied mathematics
- Language: English
- Edited by: Alan Tucker, Patrick Winkert

Publication details
- History: 1988—present
- Publisher: Elsevier
- Frequency: Monthly
- Impact factor: 2.7 (2025)

Standard abbreviations
- ISO 4: Appl. Math. Lett.

Indexing
- ISSN: 0893-9659 (print); 1873-5452 (web)

Links
- Journal homepage; Online access; Online archive

Applied Mathematics Letters is a peer-reviewed scientific journal published monthly by Elsevier. Established in 1988, it focuses on short and rapid communications in applied mathematics. Its current editors-in-chief are Alan Tucker (Stony Brook University) and Patrick Winkert (Technische Universität Berlin).

== Abstracting and indexing ==
The journal is abstracted and indexed in:

- Current Contents/Physical, Chemical & Earth Sciences
- EBSCO databases
- Ei Compendex
- Inspec
- MathSciNet
- Science Citation Index Expanded
- Scopus
- zbMATH

According to the Journal Citation Reports, the journal has a 2025 impact factor of 2.7.
