= Rebecca N. Wright =

American computer scientist

- Education: Columbia University (BA); Yale University (PhD)
- Awards: IEEE Fellow, ACM Distinguished Member
- Scientific career
- Fields: Computer security
- Workplaces: Rutgers University; Barnard College
- Doctoral advisor: Michael J. Fischer

Rebecca N. Wright (born 1967) is an American computer scientist known for her research in computer security. Her research interests include privacy, cryptographic protocols, and fault-tolerant distributed computing. She is the Druckenmiller Professor of Computer Science at Barnard College.

== Education and career ==
Wright was an undergraduate at Columbia University, graduating in 1988. She went to Yale University for her graduate studies, and completed her Ph.D. there in 1994. Her dissertation, Achieving Perfect Secrecy Using Correlated Random Variables, was supervised by Michael J. Fischer.

Wright was employed at DIMACS at Rutgers University from 2007 to 2018, starting as deputy director and becoming director in 2011. In January 2019, she moved to Barnard College, as the inaugural director of a new computer science program there.

== Recognition ==
Wright was named an IEEE Fellow in 2017 "for contributions to applied cryptography and privacy". She was named as an ACM Fellow, in the 2025 class of fellows, "for contributions to security and privacy, and for leadership in computing research and education".

In 2019, she won the Distinguished Service Award of SIGACT, part of the Association for Computing Machinery, "for her 11-year leadership of DIMACS, particularly in continuing and expanding the research and educational missions of DIMACS, for promoting diversity in computer science, and for using her expertise in privacy and security to help shape public policy on a national level".
