= Piotr Indyk =

Polish computer scientist

- Education: University of Warsaw (MA); Stanford University (PhD)
- Awards: Machtey Award (2000); NSF CAREER (2002); Sloan Fellowship (2003); Packard Fellowship (2003); Paris Kanellakis Award (2012); Simons Investigator (2013); ACM Fellow (2015)
- Scientific career
- Fields: Theoretical computer science Computational geometry Streaming algorithms Computational learning theory
- Workplaces: Massachusetts Institute of Technology
- Thesis: High-dimensional computational modeling (2000)
- Doctoral advisor: Rajeev Motwani
- Doctoral students: Jelani Nelson; David P. Woodruff

Piotr Indyk is a Polish-American theoretical computer scientist. He is the Thomas D. and Virginia W. Cabot Professor in the Theory of Computation Group in the Computer Science and Artificial Intelligence Laboratory at Massachusetts Institute of Technology.

== Academic biography ==
Indyk was born in Białystok, Poland, and grew up in Gdynia. He received the Magister (MA) degree from the University of Warsaw in 1995 and a PhD from Stanford University in 2000 advised by Rajeev Motwani. In 2000, Indyk joined MIT where he is currently the Thomas D. and Virginia W. Cabot Professor in the Department of Electrical Engineering and Computer Science.

== Research ==
Indyk's research focuses primarily on computational geometry in high-dimensions, streaming algorithms, and computational learning theory. He has made a range of contributions to these fields, particularly in the study of low-distortion embeddings, algorithmic coding theory, and geometric and combinatorial pattern matching. He has also made contributions to the theory of compressed sensing. His work on algorithms for computing the Fourier transform of signals with sparse spectra faster than the Fast Fourier transform algorithm was selected by MIT Technology Review as a TR10 Top 10 Emerging Technology in 2012.

== Awards and honors ==
In 2000, Indyk was awarded the Best Student Paper Award at the Symposium on Foundations of Computer Science (FOCS). In 2002 he received the Career Award from the National Science Foundation, and in 2003 he received a Packard Fellowship from the Packard Foundation and a Sloan Fellowship from the Alfred P. Sloan Foundation. He was a co-winner of the 2012 Paris Kanellakis Award from the Association for Computing Machinery for his work on locality-sensitive hashing. In 2012 his work co-developing the sparse Fourier transform was named by MIT Technology Review as one of the top 10 "breakthrough technologies" of the year. In 2013, he was named a Simons Investigator by the Simons Foundation. In 2015, he was named a Fellow of the Association for Computing Machinery for "contributions to high-dimensional geometric computing, streaming/sketching algorithms, and the Sparse Fourier Transform". He was elected to the American Academy of Arts and Sciences in 2023. He was elected to the National Academy of Sciences in 2024. He was elected to the National Academy of Engineering in 2026.
