= Prabhakar Raghavan =

American computer scientist

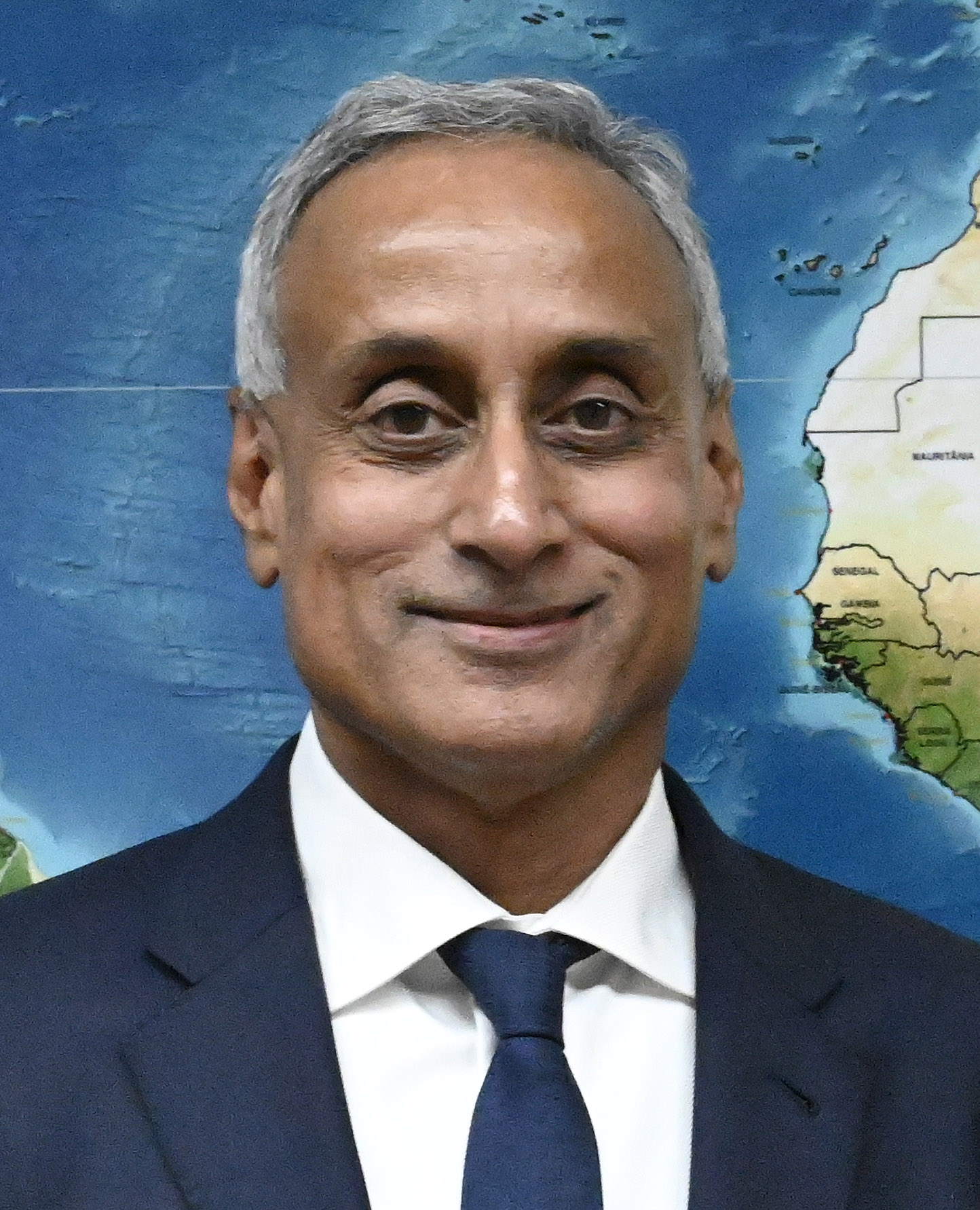
- Raghavan in 2023
- Education: University of California Berkeley, Indian Institute of Technology, Madras; Campion School, Bhopal
- Scientific career
- Workplaces: Google; University of California Berkeley, Indian Institute of Technology, Madras; Yahoo! Labs; Stanford University; IBM
- Thesis: Randomized Rounding and Discrete Ham-Sandwich Theorems: Provably Good Algorithms for Routing and Packing Problems (Integer Programming) (1987)
- Doctoral advisor: Clark D. Thompson

Prabhakar Raghavan is a computer scientist and the Chief Technologist at Google. His research spans algorithms, web search and databases. He is the co-author of the textbooks Randomized Algorithms with Rajeev Motwani and Introduction to Information Retrieval.

== Early life and education ==
Prabhakar was born in India and spent his youth in Bhopal, Madras and Manchester. In 1981, he earned a bachelor's degree in electrical engineering from the Indian Institute of Technology Madras, followed by a Master of Science in electrical and computer engineering from the University of California, Santa Barbara in 1982.

Prabhakar continued his education at the University of California, Berkeley, where he earned a Ph.D. in computer science in 1986.

== Career ==
After completing his doctorate, Prabhakar worked in various research positions at IBM. He began as a research staff member at the Thomas J. Watson Research Center. In 1994, he was promoted to manager of theory of computing. A year later, he relocated to the Almaden center in Silicon Valley to become the senior manager of the computer science principles and methodologies department of IBM Research until 2000. His research group focused on algorithms, complexity theory, cryptography, text mining, and other fields. While working for IBM in the late 1990s, he was also a consulting professor at Stanford University.

Raghavan's research team at Stanford co-existed with another researching search engines that included students Larry Page and Sergey Brin, who later founded Google.

After working 14 years at IBM, he became senior vice president and chief technology officer at enterprise search vendor Verity in 2004. In July 2005, he was hired by Yahoo! to lead Yahoo! Research in Sunnyvale, California. At Yahoo!, he worked on research projects including search and advertising. In 2011, he was appointed as Yahoo!'s chief strategy officer by CEO Carol Bartz.

In 2012, Prabhakar joined Google after severe funding cuts in Yahoo!'s research division. In 2018, he was put in charge of Ads and Commerce at Google and in 2020 his scope was expanded to include Search, Geo, and Assistant.

Raghavan has published over 100 papers in various fields and has secured 20 issued patents.

== Google Search ==
In February 2019, Google advertising executives Jerry Dischler and Shiv Venkataraman declared a "code yellow for Search revenue", an internal emergency, after seeing "steady weakness in the daily numbers". They gave three causes. The first was that "Search query growth is significantly behind forecast, particularly on desktop", and they suggested that Chrome might be a factor. The other two were revenue launches running behind schedule and weakness among some advertisers and sectors. The emails were later made public as exhibits in the antitrust case United States v. Google LLC (2020).

Leaders of the search team debated how far to take part. Search executive Nick Fox wrote that Search was "the revenue engine of the company" and that, with revenue weak, meeting the demands "seems like this is our new reality of our jobs". Ben Gomes, then head of Search, replied that "we are getting too close to the money" and "too involved with ads for the good of the product and company". He added, "I could be persuaded either way, but I am getting concerned that growth is all we are thinking about." Another search executive, Shashi Thakur, noted that one of the company's objectives for 2019 was to increase commercial queries by 2%. He pointed out that making searches more efficient for users could reduce the number of queries in the short term.

Google ended the code yellow on March 22, 2019, after meeting its exit criteria. That day, Prabhakar Raghavan, then head of ads, wrote that the revenue shortfall "was addressed by heroic RPM engineering, but the core query softness continues without mitigation". He warned that "at this rate the full year plan is a bad miss and will need drastic steps on the query side". In a draft reply, Gomes wrote that the search team cared about growth. He said queries could be raised quickly only "in user negative ways", for example by turning off spell correction or ranking improvements, and that he was "deeply deeply uncomfortable with this". He also wrote that "short term revenue has always taken precedence" over organic shopping features he had pushed for. In May 2019, Dischler asked Chrome executive Anil Sabharwal to consider reversing a Chrome address-bar change that had reduced queries. Dischler said the ads team was short of its revenue plan. Sabharwal declined for the time being, writing that "we all agree" the rollback "is worse for users and product usability". He launched other query-increasing changes to Chrome instead. At trial in 2023, Gomes testified that he had opposed using query volume as a measure of success, and that the teams later agreed to track groups of queries instead. Google told Bloomberg News that "the organic results you see in search are not affected by our ads systems".

In the same period, Google made changes to the search results page. Data from search-tracking firms suggested that the March 2019 core algorithm update partly reversed the effects of an August 2018 update. Many sites that had lost visibility in 2018 recovered, and many that had gained lost ground. Google would not say whether the update was a reversal. In 2024 Google said the update "was designed to improve the quality of our search results, as all core updates are designed to do". In January 2020, Google redesigned desktop results so that ads were marked only by a small black-and-white "Ad" label, styled like the site icons next to organic results. The Verge wrote that the redesign "blurs the line between organic search results and the ads that sit above them".

In June 2020, Raghavan replaced Gomes as head of Search, and Gomes moved to Google's education products while remaining a technical advisor to Search. A 2024 study by researchers at Leipzig University and Bauhaus-Universität Weimar monitored Google, Bing and DuckDuckGo for a year. It found that "all search engines have significant problems" with search-optimized affiliate content. In April 2024, Raghavan told employees that "things are not like they were 15–20 years ago" and that Google faced a "new operating reality". In October 2024, Google moved Raghavan to the role of chief technologist and named Fox head of Search and ads.

In April 2024, the journalist Ed Zitron published an article claiming that Raghavan was responsible for a massive decline in quality at Google following his takeover of Google Search and subsequent focus on ad revenue in the prioritization of search results.

== Awards and honors ==
Prabhakar is a member of the National Academy of Engineering and a Fellow of both the Association for Computing Machinery and the Institute of Electrical and Electronics Engineers (IEEE). From 2003 to 2009, Prabhakar was the editor-in-chief of Journal of the ACM.

In 1986, Prabhakar received the Machtey Award for Best Student Paper. In 2000, he was named a fellow of the IEEE; received the Best Paper Award at the ACM Symposium on Principles of Database Systems; and received the Best Paper Award at the Ninth International World Wide Web Conference (WWW9). In 2002, Prabhakar was named a fellow of the ACM. He received the 2006 Distinguished Alumnus Award, UC Berkeley Division of Computer Science. In 2008, Prabhakar was made a member of the National Academy of Engineering, and in 2009, he was awarded a Laurea honoris causa from the University of Bologna. In 2012, he was named a Distinguished Alumnus by the IIT Madras. In 2017, Prabhakar and co-authors received the Seoul test of time award for their 2000 paper "Graph Structure in the Web" at the WWW conference.
