= Nancy Lynch =

American computer scientist

- Born: January 19, 1948 (age 78); Brooklyn, New York City
- Education: Brooklyn College; MIT
- Known for: Distributed systems
- Awards: ACM Fellow (1997); Dijkstra Prize (2001, 2007); Member, National Academy of Engineering (2001); Van Wijngaarden Award (2006); IEEE Emanuel R. Piore Award (2010); Member, National Academy of Sciences (2015); Knuth Prize (2007)
- Scientific career
- Fields: Computer science
- Workplaces: Tufts University; University of Southern California; Florida International University; Georgia Tech; MIT
- Thesis: Relativization of the Theory of Computational Complexity (1972)
- Doctoral advisor: Albert R. Meyer
- Doctoral students: Cal Newport; George Varghese

Nancy Ann Lynch (born January 19, 1948) is a computer scientist affiliated with the Massachusetts Institute of Technology. She is the NEC Professor of Software Science and Engineering in the EECS department and heads the "Theory of Distributed Systems" research group at MIT's Computer Science and Artificial Intelligence Laboratory.

== Education and early life ==
Lynch was born in Brooklyn, and her academic training was in mathematics. She attended Brooklyn College and MIT, where she received her Ph.D. in 1972 under the supervision of Albert R. Meyer.

== Work ==
She served on the math and computer science faculty at several other universities, including Tufts University, the University of Southern California, Florida International University, and the Georgia Institute of Technology (Georgia Tech), prior to joining the MIT faculty in 1982. Since then, she has been working on applying mathematics to the tasks of understanding and constructing complex distributed systems. She has overseen the work of over 25 doctoral students, 50 master's students, and several postdoctoral researchers.

Her 1985 work with Michael J. Fischer and Mike Paterson on consensus problems received the PODC Influential-Paper Award in 2001. Their work showed that in an asynchronous distributed system, consensus is impossible if there is one processor that crashes. On their contribution, Jennifer Welch wrote that "this result has had a monumental impact in distributed computing, both theory and practice. Systems designers were motivated to clarify their claims concerning under what circumstances the systems work."

She is the author of numerous research articles about distributed algorithms and impossibility results, and about formal modeling and validation of distributed systems (see, e.g., input/output automaton). She is the author of the graduate textbook "Distributed Algorithms". She is a member of the National Academy of Sciences, the National Academy of Engineering, and an ACM Fellow.

== Recognition ==
- 1997: ACM Fellow
- 2001: Dijkstra Paper Prize of PODC conference
- 2001: Elected a member of the National Academy of Engineering for the development of theoretical foundations for distributed computing.
- 2006: Van Wijngaarden Award
- 2007: Knuth Prize
- 2007: Dijkstra Paper Prize of PODC conference
- 2010: IEEE Emanuel R. Piore Award
- 2012: Athena Lecturer
- 2015: National Academy of Sciences

== Bibliography ==
- Lynch, Nancy; Merritt, Michael; Weihl, William; Fekete, Alan (1994). Atomic Transactions. San Mateo, California: Morgan Kaufmann. pp. 476. ISBN 978-1-55860-104-8.
- Lynch, Nancy A. (1998). Distributed Algorithms (2nd ed.). San Francisco, California: Kaufmann. ISBN 978-1558603486.
- Kaynar, Dilsun; Lynch, Nancy; Segala, Roberto; Vaandrager, Frits (2011). The Theory of Timed I/O Automata (2nd ed.). San Rafael, California: Morgan & Claypool. p. 137. ISBN 978-1-60845-003-9.
