= Gary Miller (computer scientist) =

American computer scientist

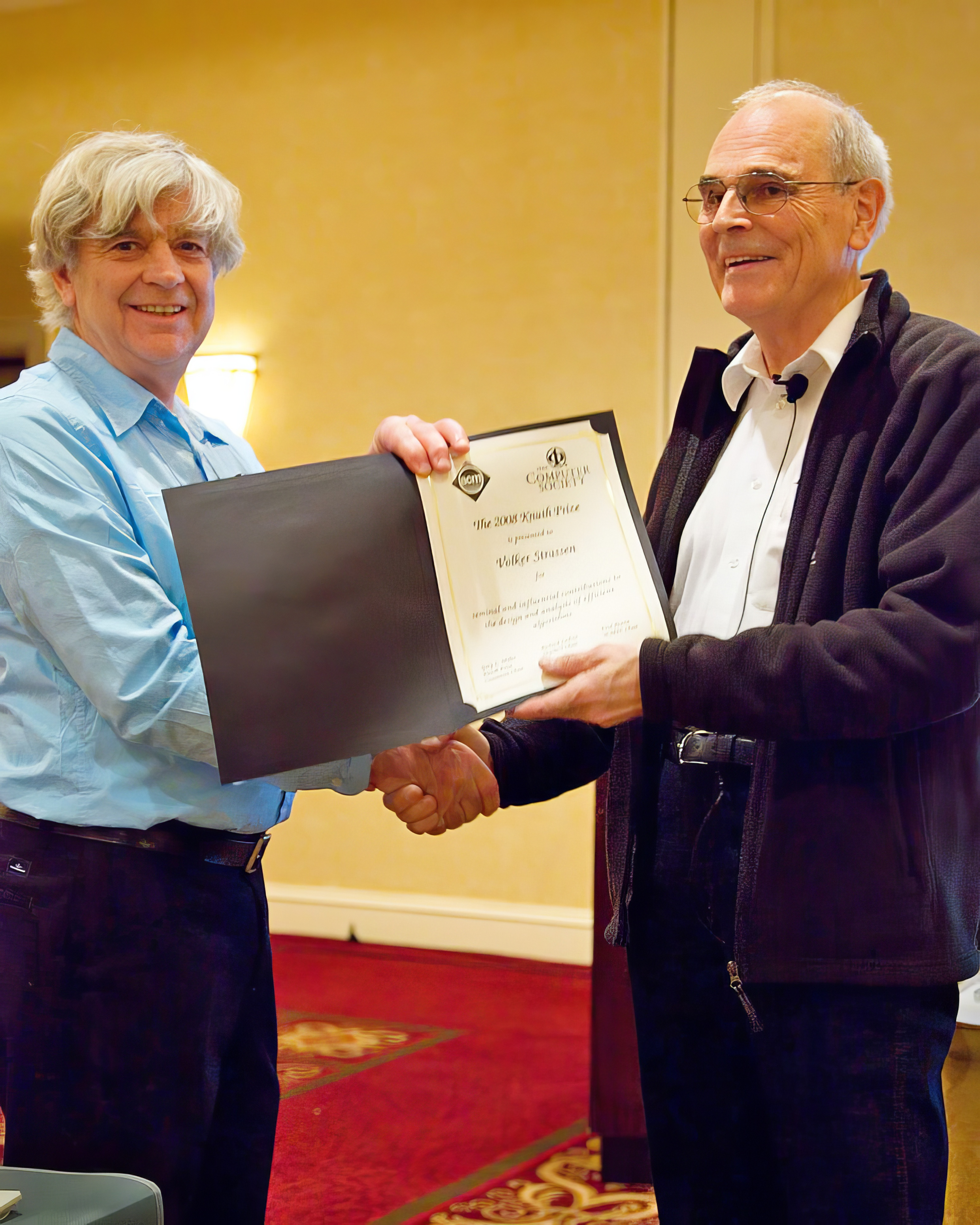
- Gary Miller (left) with Volker Strassen
- Known for: Miller–Rabin primality test
- Awards: Paris Kanellakis Award (2003) Knuth Prize (2013)
- Scientific career
- Workplaces: Carnegie Mellon University
- Thesis: Riemann's Hypothesis and Tests for Primality (1975)
- Doctoral advisor: Manuel Blum
- Doctoral students: Susan Landau; F. Thomson Leighton; Jakub Pachocki; Shang-Hua Teng; Jonathan Shewchuk

Gary Lee Miller is an American computer scientist who is a professor of computer science at Carnegie Mellon University. In 2003 he won the ACM Paris Kanellakis Award (with three others) for the Miller–Rabin primality test. He was made an ACM Fellow in 2002 and won the Knuth Prize in 2013.

== Early life and career ==
Miller received his Ph.D. from the University of California, Berkeley, in 1975 under the direction of Manuel Blum. Following periods on the faculty at the University of Waterloo, the University of Rochester, MIT and the University of Southern California, Miller moved to Carnegie Mellon University, where he is now professor of computer science. In addition to his influential thesis on computational number theory and primality testing, Miller has worked on many central topics in computer science, including graph isomorphism, parallel algorithms, computational geometry and scientific computing. His most recent focus on scientific computing led to breakthrough results with students Ioannis Koutis and Richard Peng in 2010 that currently provide the fastest algorithms—in theory and practice—for solving "symmetric diagonally dominant" linear systems, which have important applications in image processing, network algorithms, engineering and physical simulations. His Ph.D. thesis was titled Riemann's Hypothesis and Tests for Primality.
