= Santosh Vempala =

Indian computer scientist (born 1971)

- Born: 18 October 1971 (age 54); Visakhapatnam, India
- Education: Carnegie Mellon University(PhD); IIT, Delhi(B.Tech)
- Awards: Fellow of ACM (2015)
- Scientific career
- Fields: Computer Science
- Workplaces: Indian Institute of Technology Delhi; Georgia Institute of Technology
- Doctoral advisor: Avrim Blum
- Notable students: Adam Tauman Kalai (postdoc)
- Website: http://www.cc.gatech.edu/~vempala/

Santosh Vempala (born 18 October 1971) is a prominent computer scientist. He is a Distinguished Professor of Computer Science at the Georgia Institute of Technology. His main work has been in the area of Theoretical Computer Science.

== Biography ==
Vempala secured B.Tech. degree in Computer Science and Engineering from Indian Institute of Technology, Delhi, in 1992 then he attended Carnegie Mellon University, where he received his Ph.D. in 1997 under professor Avrim Blum.

In 1997, he was awarded a Miller Fellowship at Berkeley. Subsequently, he was a professor at MIT in the Mathematics Department, until he moved to Georgia Tech in 2006.

In 2024, he and Ben Cousins won the Fulkerson Prize for Gaussian cooling and algorithms for volume and Gaussian volume.

== Work ==
His main work has been in the area of theoretical computer science, with particular activity in the fields of algorithms, randomized algorithms, computational geometry, and computational learning theory, including the authorship of books on random projection and spectral methods.

In 2008, he co-founded the Computing for Good (C4G) program at Georgia Tech.

== Honors and awards ==
Vempala has received numerous awards, including a Guggenheim Fellowship, Sloan Fellowship, and being listed in Georgia Trend's 40 under 40. He was named Fellow of ACM "For contributions to algorithms for convex sets and probability distributions" in 2015. He was named a Fellow of the American Mathematical Society, in the 2022 class of fellows, "for contributions to randomized algorithms, high-dimensional geometry, and numerical linear algebra, and service to the profession".
