= SIAM Journal on Computing =

- Discipline: Computer science
- Language: English
- Edited by: Robert Krauthgamer

Publication details
- History: 1972–present
- Publisher: Society for Industrial and Applied Mathematics (United States)
- Frequency: Bimonthly
- Open access: no

Standard abbreviations
- ISO 4: SIAM J. Comput.

Indexing
- CODEN: SMJCAT
- ISSN: 0097-5397 (print); 1095-7111 (web)

Links
- Journal homepage; Online access

The SIAM Journal on Computing is a scientific journal focusing on the mathematical and formal aspects of computer science. It is published by the Society for Industrial and Applied Mathematics (SIAM).

Although its official ISO abbreviation is SIAM J. Comput., its publisher and contributors frequently use the shorter abbreviation SICOMP.

SICOMP typically hosts the special issues of the IEEE Annual Symposium on Foundations of Computer Science (FOCS) and the Annual ACM Symposium on Theory of Computing (STOC), where about 15% of papers published in FOCS and STOC each year are invited to these special issues. For example, Volume 48 contains 11 out of 85 papers published in FOCS 2016.
