= Shay Kutten =

Israeli computer scientist

- שי קוטין
- Education: Technion – Israel Institute of Technology
- Known for: Proof labeling schemes, self-stabilizing systems
- Awards: Prize for Innovation in Distributed Computing (2024)
- Scientific career
- Fields: Network Algorithms, Distributed Computing, Network Security
- Workplaces: Technion – Israel Institute of Technology
- Doctoral advisor: Shlomo Moran, Ephraim Korach

Shay Kutten (Hebrew: שי קוטין) is an Israeli computer scientist who holds the William M. Davidson Chair in Industrial Engineering and Management at the Technion – Israel Institute of Technology in Haifa, Israel. He is with the Faculty of Data and Decision Sciences. His research involves Network Algorithms, distributed computing, and Network Security.

== Education and career ==
Kutten completed his BA, MSc, and DSc at the Technion – Israel Institute of Technology. His MSc was performed under the supervision of Imrich Chlamtac and the doctorate under the supervision of Shlomo Moran and Ephraim Korach. After a post-doctorate with IBM T.J. Watson Research Center, he stayed there as a research staff member and as the group leader and manager of the network algorithms group and of the network security group he founded. There, he contributed to various IBM products and received several awards. In 1996 he joined the Technion - IIT. Kutten served as the program committee chair of EATCS DISC 1998, ACM PODC 2004, and SIROCCO 2010.

In 2024, Shay Kutten won the Prize for Innovation in Distributed Computing awarded annually at the SIROCCO conference. The prize was given "for his pioneering advancements in proof labeling schemes and their application to self-stabilizing systems."
