= Feichtner =

Feichtner is a surname. Notable people with the surname include:

- Anton Feichtner (born 1942), German television actor
- Dmitry Feichtner-Kozlov (born 1972), Russian-German mathematician, married to Eva-Maria
- Eva-Maria Feichtner (born 1972), German mathematician, married to Dmitry
- Franz Adam Feichtner, also known as "Veichtner" (1741–1822), German violinist and composer of the classical era
- Thomas Feichtner (born 1970), Austrian industrial designer
- Jack P. Feichtner (born 1946), American retail expert and trade show authority.
