= Shmuel Zaks =

Israeli computer scientist and mathematician

- שמואל זקס
- Born: 1949 (age 76–77)
- Education: Technion – Israel Institute of Technology, University of Illinois at Urbana-Champaign
- Scientific career
- Fields: Distributed computing and Computer networks
- Workplaces: Technion – Israel Institute of Technology
- Doctoral advisor: Chung Laung Liu
- Doctoral students: Tamar Eilam

Schmuel Zaks (Hebrew: שמואל זקס; born 1949) is a computer scientist and mathematician who works in the fields of distributed computing and computer networks. He is a professor at Technion – Israel Institute of Technology, where he holds the Joan Callner-Miller Chair in Computer Science.

Zaks received his BSc degree from Technion in 1971 and MSc from Technion in 1972. In 1979 he received his PhD degree from University of Illinois at Urbana-Champaign, where his PhD supervisor was Chung Laung Liu. Since then, he has done joint work with numerous co-authors, including the prolific mathematician Paul Erdős.

During the 23rd International Symposium on Distributed Computing (DISC 2009), a series of lectures was organized to celebrate Schmuel Zaks's and Michel Raynal's 60th birthdays and their contributions in the development of the field of distributed computing.

In 2017, Zaks received the Prize for Innovation in Distributed Computing, at the SIROCCO 2017 conference, for his lifetime achievements in Distributed Computing.
