= Jean-Marc Jézéquel =

French computer scientist

- Born: June 13, 1964
- Citizenship: French
- Education: University of Rennes 1
- Known for: setting up Model Driven Engineering foundations
- Spouse: Chantal Brohier
- Awards: CNRS Silver Medal (2016), ACM/IEEE MODELS Career Award (2020), Academia Europaea (2026)
- Scientific career
- Fields: computer science, software engineering
- Workplaces: Rennes, France
- Doctoral advisor: Michel Raynal

Professor Jean-Marc Jézéquel is a French computer scientist.

== Biography ==
Jean-Marc Jézéquel is a French computer scientist and professor of software engineering at the University of Rennes. His research focuses on software engineering, model-driven engineering (MDE), self-adaptive systems, runtime models, software product lines, and digital twins.

From January 2012 to December 2020, he was Director of IRISA and then President of Informatics Europe.

== Education and academic career ==
Jean-Marc Jézéquel received an engineering degree from Telecom Bretagne in 1986 and a PhD from the University of Rennes 1 in Rennes in 1989. He then worked for the Transpac (network) company on an Intelligent Network project. In 1991, he became a researcher (Chargé de recherche) at the CNRS (Centre National de la Recherche Scientifique). During most of 1996, he has been an invited researcher in Pr. Yonezawa's lab, in the University of Tokyo, Japan.

Since October 2000, he has been Professor of Software Engineering at University of Rennes, where he pursued research on the foundations of Model Driven Engineering. From 2000 to 2012 he headed an Inria research team called Triskell, which became known for its work in model-driven engineering, software language engineering, and adaptive systems.

From 2012 to 2020, he served as Director of IRISA, one of France's largest computer science research laboratories.

From January 2022 to April 2022, he was a visiting professor at McGill University.

From January 2021 to December 2023, he was Vice President of Informatics Europe, before becoming its President since 2024.

=== Research ===
Jézéquel's early research addressed distributed systems, software components, object-oriented software engineering, and contract-based development. His work on contract-aware software components contributed to the broader adoption of design-by-contract principles in component-based software engineering.

During the late 1990s and 2000s, he became associated with the development of model-driven engineering. His research contributed to model transformation, metamodeling, domain-specific languages, software product lines, and model-based software development. He was one of the principal contributors to the Kermeta language workbench for domain-specific language engineering.

His later work focused on runtime models and self-adaptive systems. He contributed to the development of the models@run.time paradigm, in which software models remain causally connected to executing systems and support monitoring, adaptation, and evolution during operation.

More recently, his research has focused on uncertainty-aware software engineering, Model-Based DevOps, and the engineering of digital twins for cyber-physical systems.

=== Professional service ===
Jézéquel has served on the steering committees and program committees of major software engineering conferences, including the International Conference on Model Driven Engineering Languages and Systems (MODELS).

He has also served on the editorial boards of journals including Software and Systems Modeling (SoSyM), IEEE Computer, and the Journal of Systems and Software.

From 2021 to 2023, he served as Vice-President of Informatics Europe, the association representing computer science departments and research institutes across Europe.

Since January 2024, he has served as President of Informatics Europe.

=== Honors and awards ===
In 2016, Jézéquel received the CNRS Silver Medal, awarded annually by the French National Centre for Scientific Research in recognition of the originality, quality, and importance of scientific contributions.

In 2020, he received the ACM/IEEE MODELS Career Award for his long-standing scientific contributions to the MDE community and his exemplary activity for the younger members of the MODELS community.

He became a Senior Member of the Institut Universitaire de France in 2023.

In 2026, he was elected a member of the Academia Europaea, a pan-European academy whose membership is by invitation and peer review in recognition of sustained scholarly excellence.

== Publications ==
Books, a selection

- Engineering Modeling Languages: Turning Domain Knowledge into Tools, CRC Press, 2016.
- Ingénierie Dirigée par les Modèles : des concepts à la pratique, Éditions Ellipses, 2012
- Design Patterns and Contracts, Addison-Wesley, 1999
- Object Oriented Software Engineering with Eiffel, Addison-Wesley, 1996

Articles, a selection:

- Design by contract: The lessons of Ariane, with Bertrand Meyer, 1997
- Making components contract aware, Computer 32 (7), 1999
- Refactoring UML models, UML 2001
- Weaving executability into object-oriented meta-languages, MODELS 2005
- Automatic test generation: A use case driven approach IEEE Trans on Software Engineering, 2006
- Models at runtime to support dynamic adaptation, Computer 42 (10), 2009
