= Sergio Rajsbaum =

Mexican computer scientist

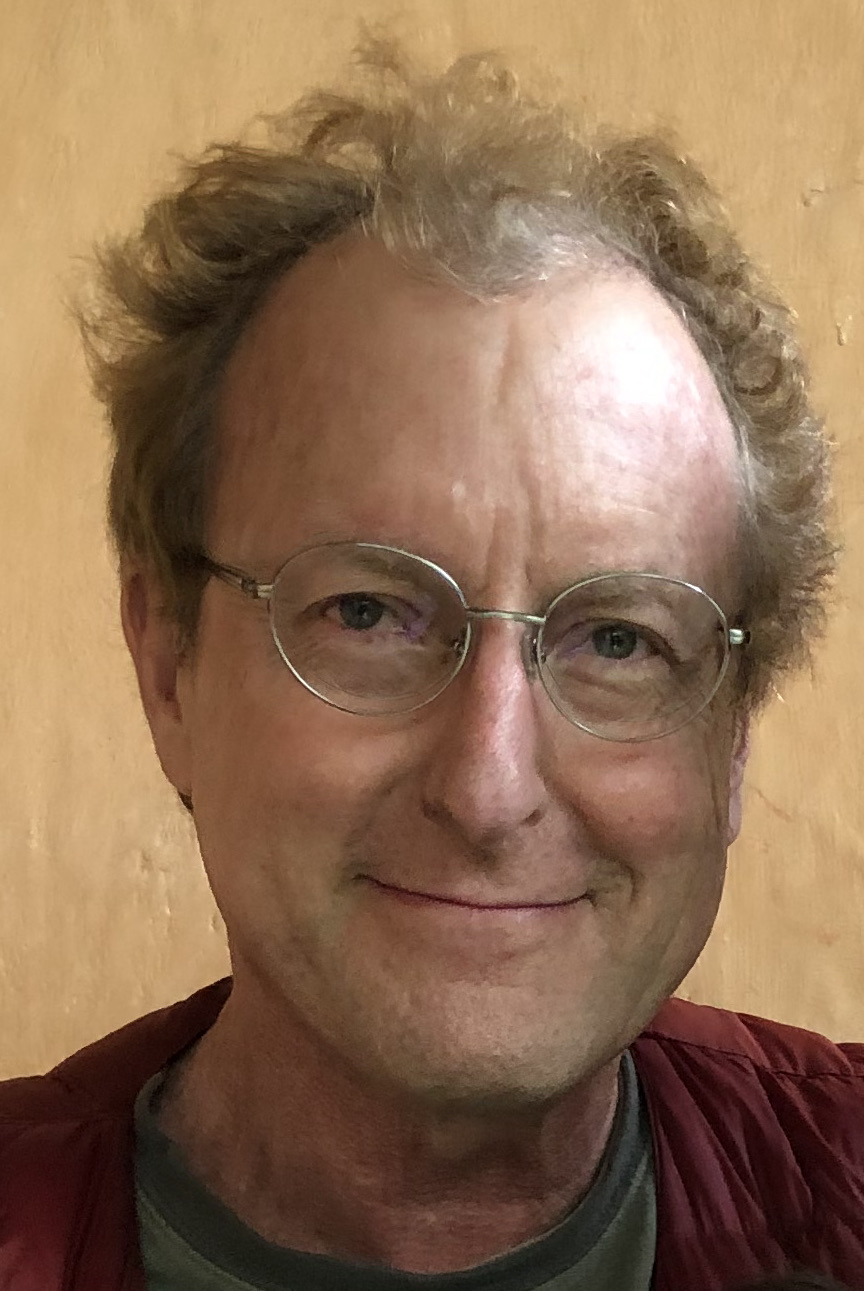
Sergio Rajsbaum

Sergio Rajsbaum (born March 3, 1962, in Mexico City, Mexico) is a Mexican computer scientist, working in the field of Theoretical Computer Science, specifically concurrent and distributed computing.

He is a Professor of the Instituto de Matemáticas of Universidad Nacional Autónoma de México, where he has been a member of the faculty since 1991.

He was a visiting researcher of Institut de recherche en informatique fondamentale (IRIF) on a Sabbatical academic year 2022 to 2023.

== Education and career ==
Rajsbaum was educated at the Facultad de Ingeniería of UNAM, earning a B.S. in computer engineering in 1985.

Rajsbaum obtained his PhD from the Technion, Israel in 1991, with thesis Synchronization in Distributed Networks written under the direction of Shimon Even. His thesis introduced the unison problem .

He did postdoctoral studies from 1993 to 1995 at the Massachusetts Institute of Technology under Nancy Lynch. The research resulted in contributions to three topics. A method to computing the achievable clock synchronization precision based on the communication and individual clock drift bounds of a given network. A simulation for direct translations of algorithms and impossibility results from a model with some resiliency to a model with a different resiliency. The study of the deep connection between distributed computing and algebraic topology, an example of the interplay between mathematics and computation

The collaboration that started in 1994 with Maurice Herlihy was the beginning of a research project that has lasted over 30 years, and overviewed in the book "Distributed Computing Through Combinatorial Topology", which they wrote together with mathematician Dmitry Feichtner-Kozlov. The topological perspective has gone beyond distributed computing leading to work in combinatorial topology and directed topology, and connections with logic, runtime verification, and social choice theory.

In 2025, Rajsbaum won the Prize for Innovation in Distributed Computing awarded annually at the SIROCCO conference.

== Selected research papers ==
- Rajsbaum, Sergio; Even, Shimon (1990). "Unison in Distributed Networks". In Capocelli, R. M. (ed.). Sequences. Springer-Verlag. pp. 479–487. doi:10.1007/978-1-4612-3352-7_38. ISBN 978-1-4612-7977-8.
- Rajsbaum, Sergio; Even, Shimon (1995). "Unison, canon, and sluggish clocks in networks controlled by a synchronizer Math". Systems Theory. 28. Springer-Verlag: 421–435. doi:10.1007/BF01185865.
- Patt-Shamir, Boaz; Rajsbaum, Sergio (1994). "A theory of clock synchronization (Extended abstract)". Proceedings of the twenty-sixth annual ACM symposium on Theory of computing - STOC '94. ACM. pp. 810–819. doi:10.1145/195058.195466. ISBN 0-89791-663-8.
- Borowsky, Elizabeth; Gafni, Eli; Lynch, Nancy A.; Rajsbaum, Sergio (2001). "The BG distributed simulation algorithm". Distributed Computing. 14 (3): 127–146. doi:10.1007/PL00008933.
- Herlihy, Maurice; Rajsbaum, Sergio (1997). "The decidability of distributed decision tasks (Extended abstract)". Proceedings of the twenty-ninth annual ACM symposium on Theory of computing - STOC '97. ACM. pp. 589–598. doi:10.1145/258533.258652. ISBN 0-89791-888-6.
- Castañeda, Armando; Rajsbaum, Sergio (2012). "New combinatorial topology bounds for renaming: the upper bound". Journal of the ACM. 59. New York, USA: ACM: 1–49. doi:10.1145/2108242.2108245.
- Castañeda, Armando; Fraigniaud, Pierre; Paz, Ami; Rajsbaum, Sergio; Roy, Matthieu; Travers, Corentin (2019). "Synchronous t-Resilient Consensus in Arbitrary Graphs". SSS. Lecture Notes in Computer Science. Vol. 11914. Springer. pp. 53–68. doi:10.1007/978-3-030-34992-9_5. ISBN 978-3-030-34991-2.
- Fraigniaud, Pierre; Rajsbaum, Sergio; Travers, Corentin (2011). "Locality and Checkability in Wait-Free Computing". DISC. Lecture Notes in Computer Science. Vol. 6950. Springer. pp. 333–347. doi:10.1007/978-3-642-24100-0_34. ISBN 978-3-642-24099-7.
- Bonakdarpour, Borzoo; Fraigniaud, Pierre; Rajsbaum, Sergio; Rosenblueth, David A.; Travers, Corentin (2022). "Decentralized Asynchronous Crash-resilient Runtime Verification". Journal of the ACM. 69 (5): 34: 1–34. doi:10.1145/3550483.
- Goubault, Éric; Ledent, Jérémy; Rajsbaum, Sergio (2021). "A simplicial complex model for dynamic epistemic logic to study distributed task computability". Information and Computation. 278 104597. arXiv:1809.03095. doi:10.1016/j.ic.2020.104597.
- Rajsbaum, Sergio; Raventós-Pujol, Armajac (2022). "A Distributed Combinatorial Topology Approach to Arrow's Impossibility Theorem". Proceedings of the 2022 ACM Symposium on Principles of Distributed Computing. ACM. pp. 471–481. doi:10.1145/3519270.3538433. ISBN 978-1-4503-9262-4.

== Awards and honors ==
With his co-workers, Rajsbaum received Best Paper Awards at the following scientific conferences. DISC (2011) for his paper "Locality and Checkability in Wait-Free computing" and SSS (2019) for his paper "Synchronous t-Resilient Consensus in Arbitrary Graphs".

His work "New combinatorial topology bounds for renaming: the upper bound" with his PhD student Armando Castañeda was recognized in the ACM Notable Computing Books and Articles of 2012 and received the Best Student Paper Award at PODC (2008).

His book "Distributed Computing Through Combinatorial Topology" was selected as a Notable Book on the Best of Computing 2013 list by the Association for Computing Machinery.

Rajsbaum received the Premio Nacional de Computación 2022 by the Academia Mexicana de Computación.

On November 15, 2024, Rajsbaum received an honorary doctorate from the Instituto Nacional de Astrofísica, Óptica y Electrónica (INAOE) during the institute's 53rd anniversary celebration.

In 2025, he was elected an ACM Distinguished Member.

His Erdös number is 2 because Rajsbaum is coauthor of Shlomo Moran, who is coauthor of Paul Erdös.

== Books ==
- Herlihy, Maurice; Kozlov, Dmitry; Rajsbaum, Sergio (2013). Distributed Computing Through Combinatorial Topology. Elsevier Science. ISBN 978-0-12-404578-1. MR 3292637. OCLC 864899516.
- Rajsbaum, Sergio (2009). Conocimientos fundamentales de computación. ISBN 978-607-02-0989-5.
