= Michel Raynal =

Michel Raynal (born 1949) is a French informatics scientist, professor at IRISA, University of Rennes, France. He is known for his contributions in the fields of algorithms, computability, and fault-tolerance in the context of concurrent and distributed systems. Michel Raynal is also Distinguished Chair professor at the Hong Kong Polytechnic University and editor of the "Synthesis Lectures on Distributed Computing Theory" published by Morgan & Claypool. He is a senior member of Institut Universitaire de France and a member of Academia Europaea.

Michel Raynal co-authored numerous research papers on concurrent and distributed computing, and has written 12 books. His last three books constitute an introduction to fault-free and fault-tolerant concurrent and distributed computing. In his publications Michel Raynal strives to promote simplicity as a "first-class citizen" in the scientific approach. Michel Raynal (and his co-authors) won several best paper awards in prestigious conferences such as IEEE ICDCS 1999, 2000 and 2001, SSS 2009 and 2011, Europar 2010, DISC 2010, and ACM PODC 2014.

When Michel Raynal became Emeritus professor (2017), INRIA, IRISA and the University of Rennes organized a Workshop in his honor featuring various speakers, including Turing Award recipient (Leslie Lamport) and Dijkstra Prize recipients (Leslie Lamport, Maurice Herlihy, Yoram Moses), and professor at Collège de France (Rachid Guerraoui).

== Education and career ==
Michel Raynal obtained bachelor degrees (French "Baccalauréat") both in literature and science. He received his PhD from University of Rennes in 1975, and his "Doctorat d'état" in 1981. During the period 1981-1984 he was a professor in a telecommunications engineer school (ENST de Bretagne) where he created and managed the informatics department. In 1984 he moved to the university of Rennes, and in 1985 he founded a research group entirely devoted to Distributed Algorithms (at that time, one of the first groups on this research topic in the world).

Michel Raynal has been an associate member of the editorial board of international journals, including the Journal of Parallel and Distributed Computing (JPDC), IEEE Transactions on Computers (TC), and IEEE Transactions of parallel and Distributed Systems (TPDS), among others.

== Research areas and scientific interests ==
Michel Raynal's research contributions concern mainly concurrent and distributed computing, and more specifically: causality, distributed synchronization, fault-tolerance, distributed agreement (consensus) and distributed computability. His first book (on mutual exclusion algorithms in both shared memory and message-passing systems) is recognized as one of the first books entirely devoted to distributed algorithms.

On the synchronization side, with Jean-Michel Hélary and Achour Mostéfaoui, Michel Raynal designed a generic message-passing mutual exclusion algorithm from which can be derived from token and tree-based mutex algorithms.

On the causality side, with co-workers he produced a very simple algorithm for causal message delivery, and an optimal vector-clock-based distributed checkpointing algorithms, which established the theoretical foundations of distributed checkpointing, and the so-called communication-based snapshot. He also introduced (with Hélary and Mostéfaoui) the notion of virtual precedence. Together with V. Garg, he introduced the concept of "normality" which extends the well-known linearizability consistency condition to the case where objects have polyadic operations.

On the agreement side, Michel Raynal (mainly with A. Mostéfaoui) produced several algorithms for asynchronous message-passing systems which solve consensus in the presence of crash failures or process Byzantine failures. This last algorithm is an incredibly simple randomized algorithm that is optimal with respect to both time and message complexities. With Mostéfaoui and Rajsbaum, Michel Raynal also introduced a new approach to solve consensus called "condition-based". This approach brought to light a very strong connection between error-correcting codes and distributed agreement problems. Michel Raynal also designed distributed algorithms for other agreement problems (such as k-set agreement and renaming).

Recently, Armando Castaneda, Sergio Rajsbaum, and Michel Raynal introduced the notion of "interval linearizability" which is the first notion that allows us to unify in a single framework the notions of "concurrent objects" and "distributed tasks".

On the computability side, Stainer, Taubenfeld, and Raynal addressed universal constructions that allow x out of k distributed state machines to progress in the presence of asynchrony and any number of process crashes. Recently, from an initial idea proposed by Taubenfeld, Michel Raynal became interested in algorithms suited to anonymous memories.

== Awards and honours ==
- 2010: Senior Member, Institut Universitaire de France
- 2015: Prize for Innovation in Distributed Computing (SIROCCO award)
- 2015: Member of Academia Europaea
- 2018 : IEEE award for Outstanding Technical Achievement in Distributed Computing
- 2019: "Outstanding Career Award" from ACM Sigops France
