= Informatics Europe =

European learned society

- The Voice of Informatics Research and Education in Europe
- Formation: 2006
- Type: Learned Society - Nonprofit organization
- Headquarters: Zurich, Switzerland
- Members: Around 200 institutions (over 30 countries)
- Official language: English
- Website: http://www.informatics-europe.org

Informatics Europe is the European association uniting university departments, research labs and companies in the field of informatics (also known as computer science).

== Overview ==
Founded in 2006, Informatics Europe is a non-profit organization with head office in Zurich, Switzerland. They represent the Research and Education community in Europe, uniting some 200 member institutions and connecting over 50,000 researchers in informatics and related disciplines from more than 30 countries. Informatics Europe members include university departments of Informatics (Computer Science, Computing, IT, ICT), public and private research labs as well as national informatics associations.

Informatics Europe liaises with other scientific organisations such as the European Research Consortium for Informatics and Mathematics (ERCIM), the Association for Computing Machinery (ACM) and the Computing Research Association (CRA).

== History ==
On 21 October 2005, the “1st European Computer Science Summit” brought together, for the first time, heads of Informatics and Computer Science departments throughout Europe. This landmark event was a joint undertaking of the Computer Science departments of the two branches of the Swiss Federal Institute of Technology: EPFL (Lausanne) and ETH (Zurich).

Besides the keynotes, talks, panels and workshops, the result of the summit was the unanimous view that European computer scientists needed an organisation with aims and scope similar to those of the CRA in the US, extended—in light of the situation in Europe—to cover education as well as research. As a result, Informatics Europe was created with the aim to become the recognized voice of the European computer science community, including both universities and research centres.

Bertrand Meyer from ETH Zurich, one of the founding members of the organisation, served as its first President from 2006 to 2011. Other former Presidents include Carlo Ghezzi, Politecnico di Milano (from 2012 to 2015), Lynda Hardman, CWI / Utrecht University (from 2016 to 2017), Enrico Nardelli, Università di Roma 'Tor Vergata', (from 2018 to 2023). The current President is Jean-Marc Jézéquel, IRISA/ University of Rennes, who took office since January 2024.

== Mission and Activities ==
Informatics Europe mission is to empower and unite the European informatics community, find concerted positions, act on shared priorities, and support policy-making in Education, Research, and the Social Impact of informatics in Europe. They do so by addressing strategic matters and emerging trends in informatics and related fields, fostering unity in the variety of their member institutions, and promoting pan-European collaboration.

Informatics Europe is involved in a number of activities and services. While some are exclusive to members (and researchers affiliated with those institutes), others are open to the broader informatics and related disciplines community.

=== ECSS - European Informatics Leaders Summit ===
The European Informatics Leaders Summit is open to the broad informatics community. It takes place once a year and offers a platform where leaders and decision-makers in Informatics and related disciplines in Europe gather to debate strategic themes and trends related to informatics research, education and its social impact. Originally the European Computer Science Summit, ECSS has been renamed since 2024 in celebration of its 20th anniversary and to reaffirm the core value and importance of the Summit to informatics leaders and communities across Europe.

Past Summits since 2005:

- ECSS 2023, Edinburgh
- ECSS 2022, Hamburg
- ECSS 2021, hybrid event (Madrid, online)
- ECSS 2020, online event
- ECSS 2019, Rome
- ECSS 2018, Gothenburg
- ECSS 2017, Lisbon
- ECSS 2016, Budapest
- ECSS 2015, Vienna
- ECSS 2014, Wroclaw
- ECSS 2013, Amsterdam
- ECSS 2012, Barcelona
- ECSS 2011, Milan
- ECSS 2010, Prague
- ECSS 2009, Paris
- ECSS 2008, Zurich
- ECSS 2007, Berlin
- ECSS 2006, Zurich
- ECSS 2005, Zurich

=== Working Groups ===
Informatics Europe fosters various working groups to shape strategic priorities within the European Informatics community. Each working group has thereby a focus on a specific topic or goal that is agreed upon at the beginning of each year. The current groups are as follows:

- Data Analysis and Reporting - aims at bringing forward solid, accurate facts and figures about Informatics research and education in Europe, including an enhanced functionality of the Informatics Europe Higher Education Data Portal.
- Ethics - to ensure recognition of the significance of teaching ethics in informatics degree courses, and to increase the literacy in ethics among educators and decision-makers in informatics research and education.
- Informatics Education Research - aims at getting academia, industry, government and society together to influence education policy in Europe towards the full recognition and establishment of Informatics as a foundational discipline in schools
- Open Science – to contribute to unbiased information, and bring together diverse opinions within a balanced framework by identifying the key players and trends behind open science.
- Diversity and Inclusion – to empower informatics institutions to integrate the diversity perspective into their education process and contribute to the development of software systems that promote diversity and inclusion in informatics.
- Research Evaluation - after two previous revisions, in 2024 a new task force examines all current changes and brings forward an updated set of recommendations for research evaluation in Informatics and closely related areas

Past working groups:

- The Wide Role of Informatics at Universities - investigated what universities did to ensure that non-informatics teaching and research is informed by best practice in Informatics. Report now available.
- Women in Informatics Research and Education - created to promote actions that help improve gender balance at all stages of the career path in Informatics. Initiated the COST Action EUGAIN, European Network For Gender Balance in Informatics and evolved into the Diversity and Inclusion working group in 2022.

=== Awards ===
Each year, Informatics Europe presents awards recognizing outstanding initiatives that advance the quality of research and education in Informatics in Europe.

Since 2023, the Best Dissertation Award aims to support young researchers in informatics by rewarding and disseminating their excellent research. The award criteria include the originality of the research and methods used, the quality of the achieved results, the societal impact of the thesis, and the quality of the exposition.

Since 2016, the Minerva Informatics Equality Award recognizes best practices in Departments or Faculties of European Universities and Research Labs that encourage and support the careers of women in Informatics research and education.

Since 2012, the Best Practices in Education Award recognizes educational initiatives across Europe that improve the quality of Informatics teaching and the attractiveness of the discipline. At present the award is on hold, awaiting sponsor.

== Publications ==
- Bridiging the Digital Talent Gap: Towards Successful Industry-University Partnerships (2020)
- Informatics Education in Europe: Institutions, Degrees, Students, Positions, Salaries – Key Data 2013-2018 (2019, Svetlana Tikhonenko, Cristina Pereira)
- Ethical/Social Impact of Informatics as a Study Subject in Informatics University Degree Programs (2019, Paola Mello, Enrico Nardelli)
- The Wide Role of Informatics at Universities (2019, Elisabetta Di Nitto, Susan Eisenbach, Inmaculada García Fernández, Eduard Gröller)
- Industry Funding for Academic Research in Informatics in Europe. Pilot Study (2018, Data Collection and Reporting Working Group of Informatics Europe)
- Informatics Education in Europe: Institutions, Degrees, Students, Positions, Salaries. Key Data 2012-2017 (2018, Svetlana Tikhonenko, Cristina Pereira)
- Informatics Research Evaluation (2018, Research Evaluation Working Group of Informatics Europe)
- Informatics for All: The strategy (2018, Informatics Europe & ACM Europe)
- When Computers Decide: Recommendations on Machine-Learned Automated Decision Making (2018, Informatics Europe & EUACM, joint report with ACM Europe)
- Informatics Education in Europe: Institutions, Degrees, Students, Positions, Salaries. Key Data 2011-2016 (2017, Cristina Pereira, Svetlana Tikhonenko)
- Informatics Education in Europe: Are We All In The Same Boat? (2017, The Committee on European Computing Education. Joint report with ACM Europe)
- Informatics in the Future: Proceedings of the 11th European Computer Science Summit (ECSS 2015), Vienna, October 2015 (2017, eds. Hannes Werthner and Frank van Harmelen, Springer Open)
- Informatics Education in Europe: Institutions, Degrees, Students, Positions, Salaries. Key Data 2010-2015 (2016, Cristina Pereira)
- Informatics Education in Europe: Institutions, Degrees, Students, Positions, Salaries. Key Data 2009-2014 (2015, Cristina Pereira)
- Informatics Education in Europe: Institutions, Degrees, Students, Positions, Salaries. Key Data 2008-2013 (2014, Cristina Pereira, Bertrand Meyer, Enrico Nardelli, Hannes Werthner)
- Informatics Education in Europe: Institutions, Degrees, Students, Positions, Salaries. Key Data 2008-2012 (2013, Cristina Pereira and Bertrand Meyer)
- Informatics Education: Europe cannot Afford to Miss the Boat (2013, ed. Walter Gander, Joint report with ACM Europe)
- Informatics Doctorates in Europe - Some Facts and Figures (2013, ed. Manfred Nagl)
- Future of the European Scientific Societies in Informatics – Blueprint, 2011
- Future of the European Scientific Societies in Informatics - Extended panel report, 2011
- Future of the European Scientific Societies in Informatics - ECSS panel report, 2010
- Research Evaluation for Computer Science, 2008
- Student Enrollment and Image of the Informatics Discipline (2008, ed. Jan van Leeuwen and Letizia Tanca)
- European Computer Science Takes its Fate in its Own Hands (2005, Bertrand Meyer and Willy Zwaenepoel)
