= Baruch Awerbuch =

Israeli-American computer scientist

- Born: 1958 (age 67–68)
- Education: Technion – Israel Institute of Technology (BS, MS, PhD)
- Known for: Research in distributed computing
- Awards: Edsger W. Dijkstra Prize in Distributed Computing
- Scientific career
- Fields: Computer science, Distributed computing
- Workplaces: Johns Hopkins University
- Doctoral advisor: Shimon Even
- Doctoral students: George Varghese

Baruch Awerbuch (born 1958) is an Israeli-American computer scientist and a professor of computer science at Johns Hopkins University. He is known for his research on distributed computing.

== Academic biography ==
Awerbuch was educated at the Technion in Haifa, Israel, earning a bachelor's degree in 1978, a master's degree in 1982, and a Ph.D. in 1984 under the supervision of Shimon Even. He worked at the Massachusetts Institute of Technology as a postdoctoral researcher, faculty member in applied mathematics, and research associate in computer science from 1984 until 1994, when he joined the Johns Hopkins faculty.

Awerbuch's former doctoral students include UCSD professor George Varghese.

== Research contributions ==
Awerbuch has published many highly cited research papers on topics including

- Cryptographic primitives for verifiable secret sharing and fault tolerant broadcasting
- Synchronization of asynchronous distributed systems
- Network routing methods that are both fault-tolerant and have a highly competitive throughput

== Awards and honors ==
Awerbuch and David Peleg were the 2008 winners of the Edsger W. Dijkstra Prize in Distributed Computing for their work on sparse partitions.
