= Jézéquel =

Jézéquel is a surname of Breton origin and may refer to:

- Jean-Marc Jézéquel (born 1964), French computer scientist
- Julie Jézéquel (born 1964), French actress and writer
- Françoise Jézéquel (born 1970), French footballer

== See also ==
- Open Jezequel golf tournament
