= Zvi Lotker =

Israeli computer scientist

- צבי לוטקר
- Education: Tel Aviv University
- Known for: Network algorithms, social networks
- Notable work: Analyzing Narratives in Social Networks
- Awards: SIROCCO Prize for Innovation in Distributed Computing (2018)
- Scientific career
- Fields: Computer Science, Communications Systems Engineering
- Workplaces: Bar-Ilan University
- Doctoral advisor: Boaz Patt-Shamir

Zvi Lotker (Hebrew: צבי לוטקר) is an Israeli computer scientist and communications systems engineer who works in the fields of digital humanities, artificial intelligence, distributed computing, network algorithms, and communication networks. He is an associate professor in the Alexander Kofkin Faculty of Engineering at Bar-Ilan University.

In 2018, Lotker was awarded the SIROCCO Prize for Innovation in Distributed Computing for his contributions to network algorithms, but especially for his contributions to the field of social networks.

Lotker is the author of the book Analyzing Narratives in Social Networks (Springer, 2021).

He is the son of the Israeli painter Oded Lotker.

== Education ==
Lotker obtained his Ph.D. from Tel Aviv University in 2003, writing his thesis "Algorithms in Networks" under the supervision of Boaz Patt-Shamir.

== Research ==
After receiving his doctorate, Lotker worked as a postdoctoral researcher at INRIA in Sophia Antipolis Mascot, France. During this time he also worked in the same capacity at the Max-Planck-Institut für Informatik in Germany. From 2004 to 2006, Lotker worked as a postdoctoral researcher at the Centrum voor Wiskunde en Informatica research group in the Netherlands. He joined the Ben-Gurion University of the Negev in Israel as a lecturer in 2006 before becoming an associate professor in 2012. In 2014, Lotker took a sabbatical and worked as a visiting professor in the Paris Diderot University in France.

== Selected publications ==
- Lotker, Z. (2021). Analyzing Narratives in Social Networks: Taking Turing to the Arts. Springer Nature.
- Avin, C., Keller, B., Lotker, Z., Mathieu, C., Peleg, D., & Pignolet, Y. A. (2015, January). Homophily and the glass ceiling effect in social networks. In Proceedings of the 2015 conference on innovations in theoretical computer science (pp. 41–50).
- Alon, N., Avin, C., Koucký, M., Kozma, G., Lotker, Z., & Tuttle, M. R. (2011). Many random walks are faster than one. Combinatorics, Probability and Computing, 20(4), 481–502.
- Avin, C., Koucký, M., & Lotker, Z. (2008, July). How to explore a fast-changing world (cover time of a simple random walk on evolving graphs). In International Colloquium on Automata, Languages, and Programming (pp. 121–132). Springer, Berlin, Heidelberg.
- Lotker, Z., Patt-Shamir, B., Pavlov, E., & Peleg, D. (2005). Minimum-weight spanning tree construction in O (log log n) communication rounds. SIAM Journal on Computing, 35(1), 120–131.
- Kesselman, A., Lotker, Z., Mansour, Y., Patt-Shamir, B., Schieber, B., & Sviridenko, M. (2004). Buffer overflow management in QoS switches. SIAM Journal on Computing, 33(3), 563–583.
