= Roger Wattenhofer =

Swiss computer scientist (born 1969)

- Born: November 17, 1969 (age 56); Schwyz, Switzerland
- Education: ETH Zurich
- Scientific career
- Fields: Computer Science
- Workplaces: ETH Zurich, Brown University, Microsoft Research
- Thesis: Distributed Counting – How to Bypass Bottlenecks (1998)
- Doctoral advisor: Peter Widmayer
- Website: disco.ethz.ch/members/wroger

Roger Wattenhofer, born in 1969, is a Swiss computer scientist, active in the field of distributed computing, networking, and algorithms. He is a professor at ETH Zurich (Switzerland) since 2001. He has published numerous research articles in computer science and a book on Bitcoin.

Together with Christian Decker in 2014, he uncovered that nearly 850,000 of the Bitcoins lost by Mt. Gox could not have been stolen by malleability attacks, as claimed by Mt. Gox. In 2017, he appeared in a movie about the Blockchain..

== Awards and honors ==
In 2012, Wattenhofer won the Prize for Innovation in Distributed Computing, awarded annually at the SIROCCO conference.. In 2026, he was jointly awarded the Edsger W. Dijkstra Prize in Distributed Computing for their paper on Distributed Verification and Hardness of Distributed Approximation.

== Selected publications ==
- Hong, Chi-Yao; Kandula, Srikanth; Mahajan, Ratul; Zhang, Ming; Gill, Vijay; Nanduri, Mohan; Wattenhofer, Roger (27 August 2013). "Achieving high utilization with software-driven WAN". ACM SIGCOMM Computer Communication Review. 43 (4): 15–26. doi:10.1145/2534169.2486012.
- Lenzen, Christoph; Locher, Thomas; Wattenhofer, Roger (1 January 2010). "Tight bounds for clock synchronization". Journal of the ACM. 57 (2): 1–42. doi:10.1145/1667053.1667057. S2CID 481610.
- Herlihy, Maurice; Kuhn, Fabian; Tirthapura, Srikanta; Wattenhofer, Roger (25 September 2006). "Dynamic Analysis of the Arrow Distributed Protocol" (PDF). Theory of Computing Systems. 39 (6): 875–901. doi:10.1007/s00224-006-1251-9. hdl:20.500.11850/24309. S2CID 6126587.
