= Dmitri Kozlov =

Dmitri Kozlov may refer to:

- Dmitri Timofeyevich Kozlov (1896 - 1967), Soviet military commander in the World War II
- Dmitri Kozlov (engineer) (1919 - 2009), Russian aerospace engineer
- Dmitry N. Kozlov (b. 1972), Russian-German mathematician
- Dmitri Kozlov (footballer) (b. 1984), Russian footballer
