= Paola Flocchini =

Canadian computer scientist

Paola Flocchini is a Canadian computer scientist known for her research in distributed computing, pattern formation, self-organizing systems, swarm behavior, and cellular automata. She is University Research Chair on Intruder Agents and the Decontamination of Communication Networks at the University of Ottawa.

Flocchini obtained her Ph.D. in 1995 from the University of Milan.

With Giuseppe Prencipe and Nicola Santoro, Flocchini is the author of the book Distributed Computing by Oblivious Mobile Robots: Synthesis Lectures on Distributed Computing Theory (Morgan & Claypool, 2012). Flocchini, Prencipe, and Santoro are also the editors of Distributed Computing by Mobile Entities: Current Research in Moving and Computing (Springer, 2019).

Flocchini is the winner of the 2019 Prize for Innovation in Distributed Computing, presented as part of the 26th International Colloquium on Structural Information and Communication Complexity (Sirocco 2019).
