= Chuck Moore =

Chuck Moore may refer to:

- Charles H. Moore (born 1938), inventor of the Forth programming language
- Charles R. Moore (computer engineer) (1961–2012), computer architect
- Chuck Moore (American football) (born 1940), former American football offensive lineman
