= Luby Law Days =

Legal scientific conference in Slovakia

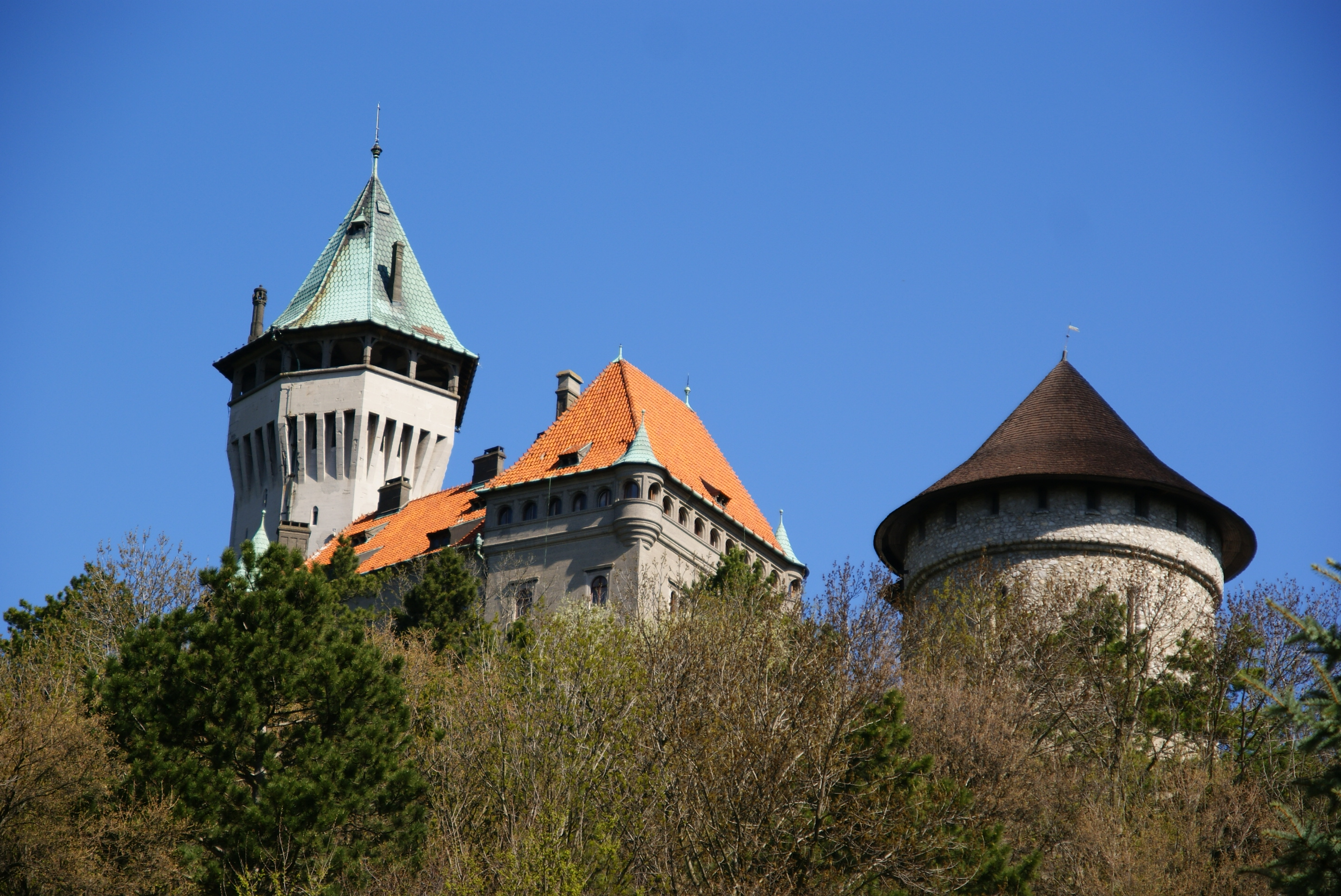
Smolenice Castle, the traditional venue for the conference

Luby Law Days (Slovak: Lubyho právnické dni, Latin: Dies Luby iurisprudentiae) is an international legal scientific conference organized in Slovakia in September biennially since 1990. It is named after the Slovak lawyer, Štefan Luby. The 17th Luby Law Days took place in September 2025.

The main organisers are Štefan Luby Foundation and the Faculty of Law of the University of Trnava. The first years were organised by the Faculty of Law of the Comenius University. In addition to them, the Slovak Academy of Sciences and the Slovak Bar Association have been involved in the organisation of some years.

The main initiators of the conference and the founders of the Štefan Luby Foundation that organizes the conference, were the legal theorist Jozef Prusák, the legal romanist Peter Blaho, the professor of civil law Ján Lazar and the professor of labour law, Helena Barancová.

Since 2002, the Luby Law Days has been held at the Smolenice Castle. The papers presented at the conference mainly concern the field of private law and are usually published in book form. The conference is regularly attended by prominent lawyers from the countries of the Visegrád Group, Germany, Austria, the Netherlands and the countries of Southern and Eastern Europe. The participants are usually professors and lecturers of private law, but also practitioners or notaries.

According to some lawyers, the conference is "unique in Central and Eastern Europe" in its category.

Years and Subjects
Nr.	Year	Subject	Locality
1st	1990	Slovak: Sloboda, právo a bezprávie, lit. 'Freedom, Law and Injustice'	Trenčianske Teplice
2nd	1992	Slovak: Slušnosť v práve, lit. 'Equity in Law'	Trenčianske Teplice
3rd	1994	Slovak: Zmluvný a zodpovednostný systém v súkromnom práve, lit. 'Contractual and Liability System in Private Law'	Trenčianske Teplice
4th	1996	Slovak: Duševné vlastníctvo v procese transformácie právneho systému, lit. 'Intellectual Property in the Process of Transformation of the Legal System'	Bratislava
5th	1998	Slovak: K návrhu slovenského občianskeho zákonníka, lit. 'On the Proposal of the Slovak Civil Code'	Bratislava
6th	2000	Slovak: Zákaz zneužitia práva, lit. 'Prohibition of Abuse of Rights'	Omšenie
7th	2002	Slovak: Zabezpečenie pohľadávok a ich uspokojenie, lit. 'Securing and Satisfying Claims'	Smolenice
8th	2004	Slovak: Kodifikácia, europeizácia a harmonizácia súkromného práva, lit. 'Codification, Europeanization and Harmonization of Private Law' German: Kodifikation, Europäisierung und Harmonisierung des Privatrechts	Smolenice
9th	2007	Slovak: Základné zásady súkromného práva v zjednotenej Európe, lit. 'Basic Principles of Private Law in United Europe' German: Fundamentale Grundsätze des Privatrechts in vereinigten Europa	Smolenice
10th	2009	Slovak: Reforma súkromného práva v strednej a východnej Európe, lit. 'Reform of Private Law in Central and Eastern Europe' German: Die Reform des Privatrechts in Mittel- und Osteuropa	Smolenice
11th	2013	Slovak: Ochrana slabšej strany v súkromnom práve, lit. 'Protection of the Weaker Party in Private Law' German: Rechtsschutz des schwächeren Subjekts im Privatrecht	Smolenice
12th	2015	Damages as a Remedy in Private Law (Slovak: Náhrada škody ako prostriedok nápravy v súkromnom práve)	Smolenice
13th	2017	Social Function of Law and Growing Wealth Inequality (Slovak: Sociálna funkcia práva a narastajúca majetková nerovnosť)	Smolenice
14th	2019	Ad hoc Legislation in Private Law (Slovak: Ad hoc legislatíva v súkromnom práve)	Smolenice
15th	2021	Loss of Life and Its Compensation In Private Law (Slovak: Ujma zo straty ľudského života a jej náhrada v súkromnom práve)	Smolenice
16th	2023	A Human In Law (Slovak: Človek v práve)	Smolenice
17th	2025	Technological Developments and Private Law (Slovak: Technologický pokrok a súkromné právo)	Smolenice
