= Štefan Banič =

Slovak inventor (1870–1941)

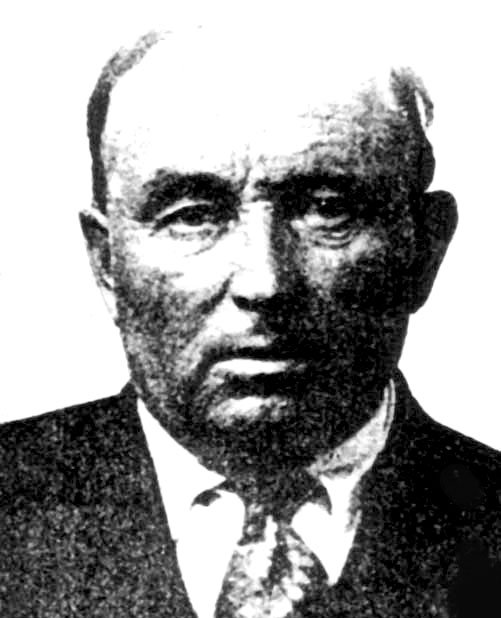
- Born: 23 November 1870; Smolenitz, Austria-Hungary (now Smolenice, Slovakia)
- Died: 2 January 1941 (aged 70); Smolenice, Slovakia
- Known for: Parachute

Štefan Banič (Slovak pronunciation: [ˈʂcefam ˈbaɲitʂ]; 23 November 1870 – 2 January 1941) was a Slovak inventor who patented an early parachute design.

Born in Jánostelek (Slovak: Neštich, Smolenická Nová Ves), Austria-Hungary (now Smolenická Nová Ves, a part of Smolenice, Slovakia), Banič immigrated to the United States and worked as a coal miner in Greenville, Pennsylvania. After witnessing a plane crash in 1912, Banič constructed a prototype of a parachute, and on August 25, 1914 was granted US patent, No. 1,108,484.

The design which was radically different from others – it was a type of umbrella attached to the body, but it is claimed that he successfully tested it in Washington, D.C. jumping first from a 15-story building and subsequently from an airplane in 1914. He sold his patent to the U.S. Army, although there is no evidence that it was ever used.

After World War I Banič returned to Czechoslovakia where he helped to explore the Driny karst cave in the foothills of the Little Carpathian Mountains, close to his hometown of Smolenice.

== Legacy ==
In 1997, US skydiver Slavo Mulik, also born in Slovakia, created the Stefan Banic Parachute Foundation which offers bronze, silver and gold medal awards to individuals involved in events, promotions and/or celebrations of skydiving, in memory of Banic.

In 2006, Slovak military paratroopers installed a memorial plaque at his birthplace in Smolenice.

In 2020, Slovakia issued a €10 silver coin depicting Banič.

Trnava – Boleráz airport, near Smolenice, carries Banič's name.
