= List of distributed computing conferences =

This is a selected list of international academic conferences in the fields of distributed computing, parallel computing, and concurrent computing.

== Selection criteria ==
The conferences listed here are major conferences of the area; they have been selected using the following criteria:-

1. the notability of the conference has been confirmed by multiple independent sources; for example, it has been mentioned in textbooks or other sources, or it has received a high ranking
2. the conference focuses on distributed and parallel computing (instead of having a much broader scope such as algorithms in general)
3. the conference covers a reasonably large part of the fields of distributed and parallel computing (instead of focusing on a narrow sub-topic).

For the first criterion, references are provided; criteria 2–3 are usually clear from the name of the conference.

== Conferences ==
- CCGrid — IEEE/ACM International Symposium on Cluster, Cloud, and Internet Computing
  - sponsored by IEEE Computer Society Technical Committee on Scalable Computing (TCSC) and ARC SIGARCH
  - Organized annually since 2001
- DISC — International Symposium on Distributed Computing
  - formerly: WDAG — Workshop on Distributed Algorithms on Graphs
  - organized in cooperation with the European Association for Theoretical Computer Science (EATCS)
- ICDCS — International Conference on Distributed Computing Systems
  - sponsored by IEEE Computer Society Technical Committee on Distributed Processing (TCDP)
  - organized in 1979, 1981, 1983, and annually since 1984
- ICPADS — International Conference on Parallel and Distributed Systems
  - sponsored by IEEE Computer Society Technical Committee on Distributed Processing (TCDP) and Technical Committee on Parallel Processing (TCPP)
  - organized in 1992
- IPDPS — International Parallel and Distributed Processing Symposium
  - organized annually since 1987
  - sponsored by IEEE Computer Society Technical Committee on Distributed Processing (TCDP) and Technical Committee on Parallel Processing (TCPP)
  - proceedings published by IEEE
- OPODIS — International Conference on Principles of Distributed Systems
  - proceedings published in the LIPIcs–Leibniz International Proceedings in Informatics (until 2014, proceedings were published by Springer in the LNCS series)
  - organized annually since 1997
- PODC — ACM Symposium on Principles of Distributed Computing
  - sponsored by the ACM special interest groups SIGACT and SIGOPS
  - organized annually since 1982
- HPDC — ACM Symposium on High-Performance Parallel and Distributed Computing
  - sponsored by the ACM for design, implementation, evaluation, and the use of parallel and distributed systems for high-end computing
- PPoPP — ACM SIGPLAN Symposium on Principles and Practice of Parallel Programming
  - sponsored by the ACM special interest group SIGPLAN
  - organised in 1988 and 1990; biennially in 1991–2005; and annually since 2006
- SIROCCO — International Colloquium on Structural Information and Communication Complexity
  - proceedings published by Springer in the LNCS series
  - organized annually since 1994
- SPAA — ACM Symposium on Parallelism in Algorithms and Architectures
  - formerly: ACM Symposium on Parallel Algorithms and Architectures
  - sponsored by the ACM special interest groups SIGACT and SIGARCH, organized in cooperation with the European Association for Theoretical Computer Science (EATCS)
  - organized annually since 1989
- CONCUR — International Conference on Concurrency Theory
  - proceedings published in the LIPIcs–Leibniz International Proceedings in Informatics
  - organised annually since 1988

== See also ==
- List of computer science conferences contains conferences in other areas of computer science.
