= Tamar Eilam =

Israeli-American computer scientist

- תמר עילם
- Education: Technion – Israel Institute of Technology (Ph.D.)
- Known for: DevOps, configuration management
- Awards: IBM Fellow, Working Mothers of the Year (Working Mother magazine)
- Scientific career
- Fields: Computer science, DevOps, Configuration management
- Workplaces: IBM Thomas J. Watson Research Center
- Doctoral advisor: Shlomo Moran, Shmuel Zaks

Tamar Eilam (Hebrew: תמר עילם) is an Israeli-American computer scientist at IBM's Thomas J. Watson Research Center at Yorktown Heights, New York whose work for IBM centers around DevOps and configuration management.

Eilam completed her Ph.D. in 2000 at the Technion – Israel Institute of Technology. Her dissertation, Cost versus Quality: Tradeoffs in Communication Networks, was jointly supervised by Shlomo Moran and Shmuel Zaks. She immigrated to the US in 2000, after completing her Ph.D., to join IBM Research.

In 2014 IBM named her as an IBM Fellow. In 2016, Working Mother magazine named her as one of their Working Mothers of the Year.

== Selected publications ==
- Jayasinghe, D; Pu, C; Eilam, T; Steinder, M; Whally, I; Snible, E (2011). "Improving performance and availability of services hosted on IaaS clouds with structural constraint-aware virtual machine placement". 2011 IEEE International Conference on Services Computing. pp. 72–79.
- US 8281307, W.C. Arnold; T. Eilam & M.H. Kalantar et al., "Virtual solution composition and deployment system and method", published 2012
- US 9280335, A. Adi; W.C. Arnold & D.C. Berg et al., "Semantically rich composable software image bundles", published 2016
- Eilam, T; Gavoille, C; Peleg, D (1998). "Compact routing schemes with low stretch factor". Proceedings of the Seventeenth Annual ACM Symposium on Principles of Distributed Computing.
- US 10776705, T. Eilam; L. Fong & G. Hunt et al., "Provisioning of services based on declarative descriptions of a resource structure of a service", published 2005
- Konstantinou, A.V.; Eilam, T; Kalantar, M; Totok, A.A.; Arnold, W; Snible, E (2009). "An architecture for virtual solution composition and deployment in infrastructure clouds". Proceedings of the 3rd International Workshop on Virtualization Technologies in Distributed Computing.
- US 6618737, Y. Aridor; M. Factor & T. Eilam et al., "Speculative caching of individual fields in a distributed object system", published 2003
- Hummer, W; Rosenberg, F; Oliveira, F; Eilam, T (2013). "Testing idempotence for infrastructure as code". Middleware 2013: ACM/IFIP/USENIX 14th International Middleware Conference.
- US 8291378, W.C. Arnold; D.C. Berg & B.L. Blancett et al., "Simplified deployment modeling", published 2012
- US 7676552, T. Eilam; L.L. Fong & G.D.H. Hunt et al., "Automatic provisioning of services based on a high level description and an infrastructure description", published 2010
