= SPAA (disambiguation) =

An SPAA is a self-propelled anti-aircraft weapon.

SPAA may also refer to:

- Rutgers School of Public Affairs and Administration, at Rutgers University, Newark, New Jersey
- Screen Producers Australia, formerly Screen Producers Association of Australia, a professional association
- Symposium on Parallelism in Algorithms and Architectures, an academic conference in the fields of parallel computing and distributed computing
- Subpixel anti-aliasing, a way to increase the apparent resolution of a computer's screen
