= David Peleg (computer scientist) =

Israeli computer scientist

- דוד פלג
- Born: 1957 (age 68–69)
- Education: Weizmann Institute of Science
- Known for: Sparse partitions
- Awards: Edsger W. Dijkstra Prize in Distributed Computing (2008 and 2026) SIROCCO Prize for Innovation in Distributed Computing (2011) Fellow of the Association for Computing Machinery (2016) Fellow of the European Association for Theoretical Computer Science (2021)
- Scientific career
- Fields: Algorithms, Computer Networks, Distributed Computing
- Workplaces: Weizmann Institute of Science
- Doctoral advisor: David Harel

David Peleg (Hebrew: דוד פלג) is an Israeli computer scientist. He is a professor at the Weizmann Institute of Science, holding the Norman D. Cohen Professorial Chair of Computer Sciences. He served as dean of the Faculty of Mathematics and Computer Science from 2010 to 2019. His main research interests are algorithms, computer networks, and distributed computing. Many of his papers deal with a combination of all three.

He received his Ph.D. from the Weizmann Institute under the supervision of David Harel. He has published numerous papers and a book, chaired leading conferences in computer science, and is an editor of several scientific journals.

== Awards and honors ==
In 2008, he was awarded the Edsger W. Dijkstra Prize in Distributed Computing along with Baruch Awerbuch for their 1990 paper “Sparse partitions.”

In 2011, he won the SIROCCO Prize for Innovation in Distributed Computing, awarded annually at the SIROCCO conference.

In 2016, he was named a Fellow of the Association for Computing Machinery for contributions to distributed computing and graph algorithms.

Since 2020, Peleg is editor-in-chief of the journal Information and Computation.

In 2021, Peleg was named a Fellow of the European Association for Theoretical Computer Science for his contributions to distributed graph algorithms, wireless networks, robotics and social networks, and for his support of theoretical computer science in Europe.

In 2026, Peleg received the Edsger W. Dijkstra Prize in Distributed Computing for a second time, jointly with Atish Das Sarma, Stephan Holzer, Liah Kor, Amos Korman, Danupon Nanongkai, Gopal Pandurangan and Roger Wattenhofer, for their paper ‘Distributed Verification and Hardness of Distributed Approximation’.

== Selected publications ==
- Awerbuch, Baruch; Peleg, David (1990), "Sparse partitions", Proceedings of the 31st Annual Symposium on Foundations of Computer Science (FOCS 1990), pp. 503–513, doi:10.1109/FSCS.1990.89571, ISBN 978-0-8186-2082-9, S2CID 2138822. Dijkstra Prize 2008.
- Peleg, David (2000), Distributed Computing: A Locality-Sensitive Approach, SIAM, ISBN 978-0-89871-464-7, MR 1790362, archived from the original on 2009-08-06
