= Federated Computing Research Conference =

The Federated Computing Research Conference (FCRC) is an event that brings together several academic conferences, workshops, and plenary talks in the field of computer science. FCRC has been organized and held in the United States in 1993, 1996, 1999, 2003, 2007, 2011, 2015, 2019, and 2023. The 2023 event was held in Orlando, Florida.

In the first FCRC, the main organiser was the Computing Research Association; since then, the Association for Computing Machinery has taken the lead in organising the event.

The Turing Award 1998, 2002, 2006, 2010, and 2014 recipients gave plenary talks in FCRC 1999, 2003, 2007, 2011, and 2015. Other plenary speakers in FCRC include László Babai, Charles Bennett, Randal Bryant, Bob Colwell, David Culler, Cynthia Dwork, Shafi Goldwasser, Michael J. Flynn, Hector Garcia-Molina, John L. Hennessy, Torsten Hoefler, Richard Karp, Randy Katz, Ken Kennedy, James Kurose, Ed Lazowska, Barbara Liskov, Robin Milner, Charles R. (Chuck) Moore, Christos Papadimitriou, Michael Rabin, Scott Shenker, Burton Smith, Guy L. Steele Jr., Avi Wigderson, Maurice Wilkes, William A. Wulf.

== Locations ==
- 1993: San Diego
- 1996: Philadelphia
- 1999: Atlanta
- 2003: San Diego
- 2007: San Diego
- 2011: San Jose, California
- 2015: Portland, Oregon
- 2019: Phoenix, Arizona
- 2023: Orlando, Florida

== Conferences ==
The following table contains conferences that have been part of FCRC at least twice; workshops have not been listed.

CCC	Computational Complexity Conference	1993	1996	1999	-	2007	2011	2015	-	-
EC	ACM Conference on Electronic Commerce	-	-	-	2003	2007	2011	2015	2019	-
ISCA	ACM/IEEE International Symposium on Computer Architecture	1993	1996	1999	2003	2007	2011	2015	2019	2023
LCTES	ACM SIGPLAN/SIGBED Conference on Languages, Compilers, and Tools for Embedded Systems	-	-	1999	2003	2007	-	-	2019	2023
SIGMETRICS	ACM SIGMETRICS International Conference on Measurement and Modeling of Computer Systems	-	1996	1999	2003	2007	2011	2015	2019	2023
PLDI	ACM SIGPLAN Conference on Programming Language Design and Implementation	-	1996	1999	2003	2007	2011	2015	2019	2023
PODC	ACM Symposium on Principles of Distributed Computing	-	1996	1999	-	-	2011	-	-	2023
PPoPP	ACM SIGPLAN Symposium on Principles and Practice of Parallel Programming	1993	-	1999	2003	-	-	-	-	-
SPAA	ACM Symposium on Parallelism in Algorithms and Architectures	-	-	-	2003	2007	2011	2015	2019	2023
SoCG	ACM Symposium on Computational Geometry	1993	1996	-	2003	-	-	-	-	-
STOC	ACM Symposium on Theory of Computing	1993	1996	1999	2003	2007	2011	2015	2019	2023

Other notable events held in conjunction with FCRC include HOPL III, the History of Programming Languages Conference in 2007.

== References and Notes ==
- FCRC 1993 program (a PostScript file, reverse page order).
- Information about FCRC 1993 can be found also in the following posts in Usenet news (links to Google Groups):
  - PPoPP 1993 program.
  - PPoPP 1993 CFP.
  - SoCG 1993 CFP.
  - WOPA 1993 program.
- FCRC 1996 web site.
- FCRC 1999 web site.
- FCRC 2003 web site.
- FCRC 2007 web site.
- FCRC 2011 web site.
- FCRC 2015 web site.
- FCRC 2019 web site.
- FCRC 1999 on CRA web site.
- Erik Demaine's List of Events: FCRC.
