= Stolpersteine in the Trnava Region =

Memorial installations in Slovakia

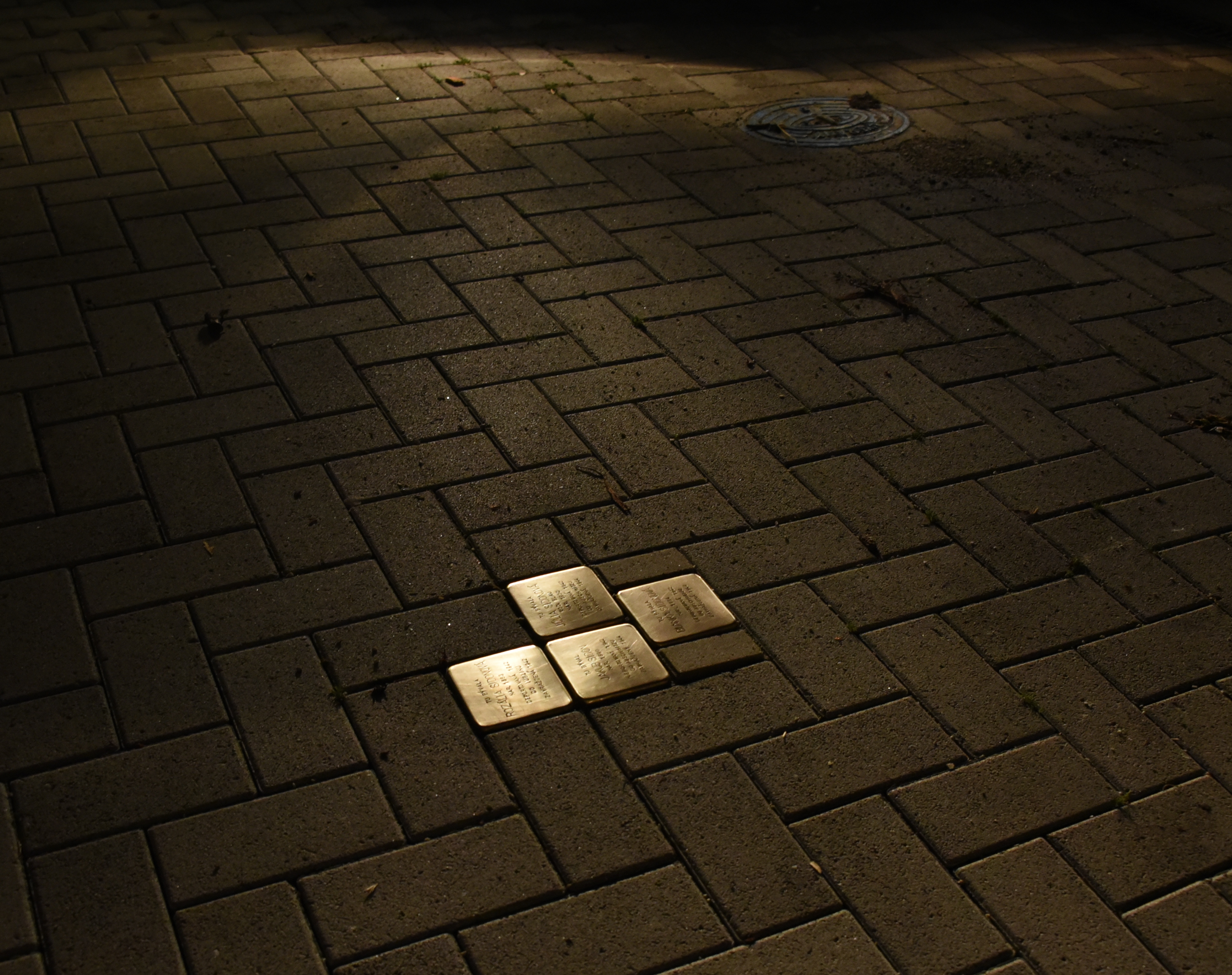
Stolpersteine for family Sidon in Smolenice

Stolpersteine is the German name for stumbling blocks collocated all over Europe by German artist Gunter Demnig. They remember the fate of the victims of Nazi Germany being murdered, deported, exiled or driven to suicide. The first Stolpersteine of the Trnavský kraj, the Trnava Region of present-day Slovakia (formerly Czechoslovakia), were collocated in August 2016.

Generally, the stumbling blocks are posed in front of the building where the victims had their last self chosen residence. The name of the Stolpersteine in Slovak is: pamätné kamene, memorial stones.

The lists are sortable; the basic order follows the alphabet according to the last name of the victim.

== Dunajská Streda ==
On 13 August 2018, three Stolpersteine were collocated in Dunajská Streda. The inscriptions are both in Slovak and in Hungarian language.

Stone	Inscription	Location	Life and death
	HERE LIVED; ÁRMIN KORNFELD; BORN 1883; DEPORTED 1944; TO AUSCHWITZ; MURDERED; 18.6.1944	Hlavná ulica 4237; Dunajská Streda	Ármin Kornfeld (1883—1944)
	HERE LIVED; GIZELLA KORNFELD; NÉE GRÜNWALD; BORN 1889; DEPORTED 1944; TO AUSCHWITZ; MURDERED; 18.6.1944	Hlavná ulica 4237; Dunajská Streda	Gizella Kornfeld née Grünwald (1889—1944)
	HERE LIVED; TERÉZIA VÉGH; NÉE KORNFELD; BORN 1913; DEPORTED; 1944 TO AUSCHWITZ; TO PLASZOW; TO BERGEN-BELSEN; MURDERED; 28.2.1945	Hlavná ulica 4237; Dunajská Streda	Terézia Végh née Kornfeld (1913—1945)

== Piešťany ==
1.065 inhabitants of Piešťany with Jewish roots were murdered in the course of the Shoah. The Stolperstein of Piešťany was posed by Gunter Demnig himself on 6 August 2016.

Stone	Inscription	Location	Life and death
	HERE LIVED; MÁRIA SCHULZOVÁ; NÉE WINTEROVÁ; BORN 1907; DEPORTED 5.1.1945; MURDERED IN MAY 1945; IN BERGEN-BELSEN	Zelený Strom	Mária Schulzová née Winterová was born in 1907 in Piešťany as the youngest daughter to Ľudovít Winter (1870-1968) and Leona née Schauer (1878-1934). She had a brother and a sister, Jan and Elisabeth, and two half siblings from her mothers first marriage. Her father was a well-known and wealthy entrepreneur. From 1889 to 1940 the Winter family hat rented the spa of Piešťany and brought it to international fame. All properties of the family were nationalized in the 1940s and never restored. She was married to Pál Schulz, also Paul. The couple had two children, Agnes (1928-1992) and Andrej (1929-2012). Schulzová was deported on 5 January 1945 to Bergen-Belsen concentration camp. She was liberated by British troops on 15 April 1945, but died of the consequences a few weeks later in block 43. Her children, her father, her brother and sister could all survive the Shoah. Her father had been deported, first to Sereď concentration camp, then to Theresienstadt concentration camp. After his return to Piešťany, he took care of Maria's children and raised them. Maria's daughter was married to Zoltán Žuzič, had a daughter, Katarína (b. 1954), and a granddaughter, Deniska (b. 1974). Her son became a teacher, was married to Alžbeta née Lorinczová (b. 1926) and had a daughter, Andrea (b. 1966). She initiated the collocation of the Stolperstein for Mária Schulzová. At the ceremony, Piešťany's mayor, Miloš Tamajka, paid tribute to the great services of the Winter family for city and spa.

== Smolenice ==
The Stolpersteine in Smolenice were posed by Gunter Demnig himself on 6 August 2016.

Stone	Inscription	Location	Life and death
	HERE LIVED; FRIEDRICH BEINHACKER; BORN 1907; DEPORTED 1942; TO AUSCHWITZ; MURDERED 1942	Obrancov mieru 43	Friedrich Beinhacker, also Fridrich and Frigyes, was born on 3 September 1907. He was married. His last residence before deportation was in Neštich, now Smolenická Nová Ves. On 13 April 1942 he was deported from Sereď to Auschwitz concentration camp. His transport number was 21. He was murdered by the Nazi regime.
	HERE LIVED; JAKUB SIDON; BORN 1896; DEPORTED 1942; TO AUSCHWITZ; MURDERED 1942	SNP 290/85	Jakub Sidon was born on 26 December 1896 in Smolenice. His mother was Rozália Sidonová (see below). He was married to Júlia née Blau. The couple had a daughter, Blanka (see below). Jakob Sidon, his wife, their daughter Blanka and his mother were all deported on 11 April 1942 from Trnava to Lublin Ghetto. They were all murdered by the Nazi regime, according to the Stolperstein in 1942 in Auschwitz. Reports on the death of Jakub Sidon, Blanka and Julia Sidonová were submitted to Yad Vashem in 2008 by a relative of his wife, Eva Duricková, who lived in Trenčín at that time.
	HERE LIVED; BLANKA SIDONOVÁ; BORN 1934; DEPORTED 1942; TO AUSCHWITZ; MURDERED 1942	SNP 290/85	Blanka Sidonová was born 1934 in Smolenice. Her parents were Jakub Sidon (see above) and Júlia née Blau (see below). The girl, her parents and her grand mother Rozália were all deported on 11 April 1942 from Trnava to Lublin Ghetto. They were all murdered by the Nazi regime, according to the Stolperstein in 1942 in Auschwitz. Also her grandparents from the maternal side and her uncle Shmel lost their lives in the course of the Shoah.
	HERE LIVED; JÚLIA SIDONOVÁ; NÉE BLAU; BORN 1900; DEPORTED 1942; TO AUSCHWITZ; MURDERED 1944	SNP 290/85	Júlia Sidonová née Blau, also Juliška, was born on 20 May1900 in Čachtice. Her parents were Filip Blau, a baker, born in 1872, and Amalia née Berger, born in 1875. She had three brothers and three sisters. Two of them were Samuel (b. 1906) and Blanka (b. 1912). She was married to Jakub Sidon (see above). The couple had at least two children, Blanka (see above). She was a housewife. Mother, father, their 7 years old daughter and her mother-in-law were all deported on 11 April 1942 from Trnava to Lublin Ghetto. They were all murdered by the Nazi regime, according to the Stolperstein in 1942 in Auschwitz. Her parents and five of her siblings were also murdered in the course of the Shoah.
	HERE LIVED; ROZÁLIA SIDONOVÁ; BORN 1863; DEPORTED 1942; TO LUBLIN; MURDERED 1942	SNP 290/85	Rozália Sidonová was born on 14 March 1863 in Bíňovce to Samuel / Schmaj Sidon (born 1839) and Blumenta Vogel. She was the widow of Márkusz Meir Sidon (born 8 Mar 1843, Died 19 Mar 1937 in Smolenice), with whom she had 6 children (all born in Smolenice): Regina born 17 Sep 1889; Selma Sarah born 16 Jan 1892; Jozefine Pessel born 23 Apr 1894; Jakub (see above); Johanna Hindel born circe 1898; Janka born 12 Nov 1900; Rozalia's last residence before deportation was in Smolenice, where she lived with her son, her daughter-in-law and their children. She and her family were deported on 11 April 1942 from Trnava to Lublin Ghetto and lost her life in the course of the Shoah.

== See also ==
- List of cities by country that have stolpersteine
