= Smolenice =

- Municipality
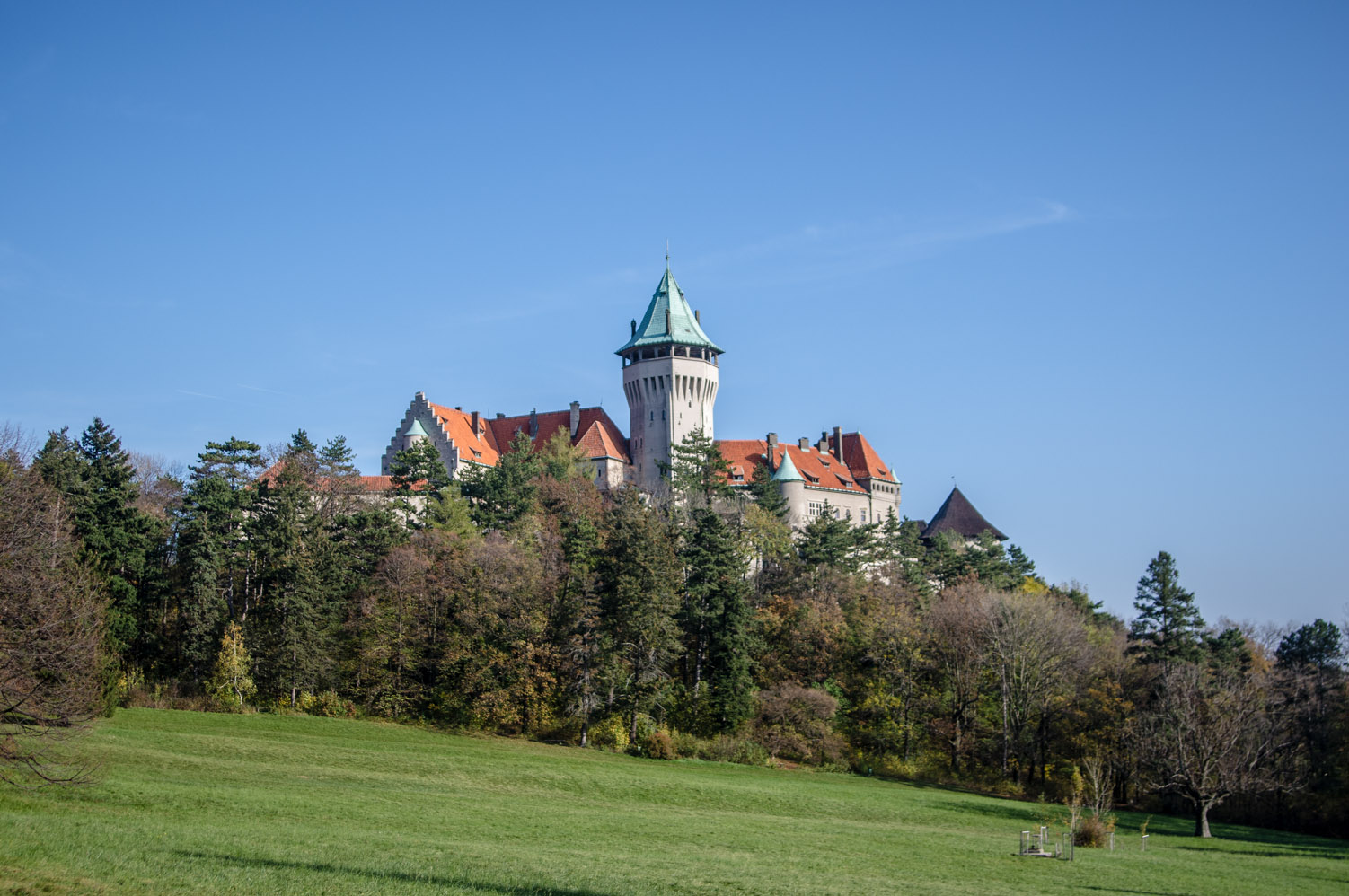
- Smolenice Castle

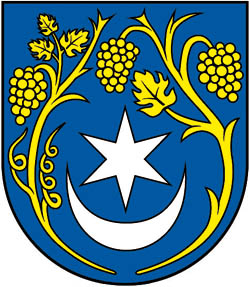
- Flag Coat of arms

- Location of Smolenice in the Trnava Region Location of Smolenice in Slovakia
- Coordinates: 48.51°N 17.43°E
- Country: Slovakia
- Region: Trnava Region
- District: Trnava District
- First mentioned: 1256

Area
  - Total: 28.96 km^{2} (11.18 sq mi)
- Elevation: 224 m (735 ft)

Population (2025)
  - Total: 3,242
- Time zone: UTC+1 (CET)
  - Summer (DST): UTC+2 (CEST)
- Postal code: 919 04
- Area code: +421 33
- Vehicle registration plate (until 2022): TT
- Website: www.smolenice.com

Smolenice (Hungarian: Szomolány; German: Smolenitz) is a village and municipality of Trnava District in the Trnava Region of Slovakia, on the foothills of the Little Carpathians. It is 60 km northeast of Bratislava and 25 km northwest of Trnava. The village is made of two parts, Smolenice and Smolenická Nová Ves (formerly Neštich).

== Geography ==
The municipality lies at an altitude of 224 metres (735 ft) and covers an area of 28.96 km^{2} (11.18 sq mi) (2025).

== History ==
The location of Smolenice at the edge of the basin of Trnava, easy access, and fertility facilitated settlement of the land in the Paleolithic era. There are only occasional archaeological discoveries from this time, however, with more coming from the Neolithic era. The most significant period was the transition between the Bronze and Iron Ages, when the Celts around the 6th century BC had an oppidum above the village. There was a settlement on the same place during the Great Moravia period. From the 10th century it was part of the Kingdom of Hungary. The village was first mentioned in 1256 under name villa Solmus, though the settlement started to grow in the late Middle Ages. In the 14th century, the gothic Smolenice Castle was built above the village, as a part of a chain of fortifications protecting the passes through the Little Carpathians. The castle was royally owned at first, but it changed hands for several centuries until, in disrepair, in 1777 the Pálffys assumed ownership of it. On 28 May, 1704 the battle of Smolenice between the Kurucs and Austrian Imperial army took place. During the Napoleonic Wars, it burned down, and only the outer fortifications remained. In the 20th century, reconstruction of the Smolenice Castle ruins began, and was finished in 1953. From 1880 to 1883, Count Jozef Pálffy built a wood processing plant near the nearby village of Majdán. This was replaced in 1968 with the a paint factory Chemolak. On 6 August 2016 Cologne artist Gunter Demnig erected five Stolpersteine for Friedrich Beinhacker and four members of the Sidon family, all murdered by the Nazi regime.

== Population ==
Population statistic (10 years)
Year	1995	2005	2015	2025
Count	3249	3264	3337	3242
Difference		+0.46%	+2.23%	−2.84%

Population statistic
Year	2024	2025
Count	3228	3242
Difference		+0.43%

It has a population of 3242 people (31 December 2025).

=== Ethnicity ===
Census 2021 (1+%)
Ethnicity	Number	Fraction
Slovak	3098	95.38%
Not found out	124	3.81%
Total	3248	

In year 2021 was 3248 people by ethnicity 3098 as Slovak, 124 as Not found out, 24 as Czech, 20 as Other, 10 as Hungarian, 7 as German, 6 as Canadian, 5 as Vietnamese, 4 as Russian, 3 as French, 2 as Jewish, 2 as Ukrainian, 2 as Rusyn, 2 as Austrian, 2 as Croatian, 2 as Bulgarian, 1 as Silesian, 1 as Polish and 1 as Korean.

Note on population: The difference values of population numbers in the table "Population statistic" and in the sections "Ethnicity" & "Religion" is caused by the use of various statistical methods.

=== Religion ===
Census 2021 (1+%)
Religion	Number	Fraction
Roman Catholic Church	2202	67.8%
None	795	24.48%
Not found out	125	3.85%
Total	3248	

In year 2021 was 3248 people by religion 2202 from Roman Catholic Church, 795 from None, 125 from Not found out, 31 from Evangelical Church, 18 from Other, 13 from Other and not ascertained christian church, 13 from Christian Congregations in Slovakia, 11 from Greek Catholic Church, 9 from Eastern Orthodox Church, 9 from Buddhism, 8 from Ad hoc movements, 4 from Calvinist Church, 3 from Islam, 2 from Paganism and natural spirituality, 1 from Old Catholic Church, 1 from Jehovah's Witnesses, 1 from United Methodist Church, 1 from Church of the Brethren and 1 from Seventh-day Adventist Church.

== Sights ==
- Smolenice Castle
- Ruins of Celtic oppidum on the Molpír hill
- The Driny limestone cave, the only publicly accessible cave in western Slovakia
- Little Carpathians with many castle ruins, with the protected Hlboča valley, and the highest point of the Little Carpathians, Záruby (768 m)
- Grave of Štefan Banič

== Notable people ==
- Štefan Banič (1870–1941), inventor
- Marcel Gery (born 1965), Slovak-Canadian swimmer
