= Shimon Even =

Israeli computer science researcher (1935 – 2004)

- שמעון אבן
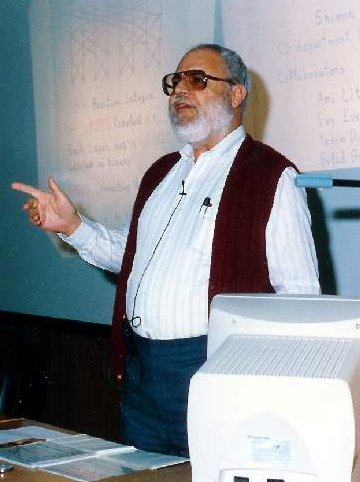
- Born: June 15, 1935; Tel Aviv, British Mandate for Palestine (present-day Israel)
- Died: May 1, 2004 (aged 68)
- Education: Harvard University
- Scientific career
- Fields: Computer Science, Cryptography
- Workplaces: Technion, Weizmann Institute of Science
- Doctoral advisor: Hao Wang
- Doctoral students: Oded Goldreich, Baruch Awerbuch

Shimon Even (Hebrew: שמעון אבן; June 15, 1935 – May 1, 2004) was an Israeli computer science researcher. His main topics of interest included, algorithms, graph theory and cryptography. He was a member of the Computer Science Department at the Technion, since 1974. Shimon Even was the PhD advisor of Oded Goldreich, a prominent cryptographer.

== Books ==
- Algorithmic Combinatorics, Macmillan, 1973.
- Graph Algorithms, Computer Science Press, 1979. ISBN 0-7167-8044-5.

== See also ==
- Oblivious transfer
