= Eva-Maria Feichtner =

German mathematician (born 1972)

Eva-Maria Elisabeth Feichtner (born 1972) is a German mathematician, the founder and director of the Institute for Algebra, Geometry, Topology and their Applications at the University of Bremen, where she is professor of algebra and vice president of internationalization and diversity. Topics in her research have included tropical geometry, matroid polytopes, Chow rings, toric varieties, lattices and semilattices, and the wonderful compactification.

== Education and career ==
Feichtner earned a diploma in mathematics in 1994 at the Free University of Berlin, and a Ph.D. in 1997 at Technische Universität Berlin. Her dissertation, Cohomology Algebras of Subspace Arrangements and of Classical Configuration Spaces, was supervised by Günter M. Ziegler. She completed her habilitation in 2004 at Technische Universität Berlin.

After postdoctoral research at the Massachusetts Institute of Technology and Institute for Advanced Study, she became an assistant professor at ETH Zurich in 1999, and a research professor at ETH Zurich in 2005. She moved to the University of Stuttgart in 2006 as professor of geometry and topology, and to the University of Bremen in 2007 as professor of algebra. She became vice president of internationalization and diversity at the University of Bremen in 2017, succeeding Yasemin Karakaşoğlu.

== Personal life ==
Feichtner is married to Dmitry Feichtner-Kozlov, with whom she frequently collaborates mathematically.
