= Prize for Innovation in Distributed Computing =

The Prize for Innovation in Distributed Computing (also called SIROCCO award) is an award presented annually at the conference International Colloquium on Structural Information and Communication Complexity (SIROCCO) to a living individual (or individuals) who have made a major contribution to understanding "the relationships between information and efficiency in decentralized computing", which is main area of interest for this conference. The award recognizes innovation, in particular, it recognizes inventors of new ideas that were unorthodox and outside the mainstream at the time of their introduction. There are two restrictions for being eligible for this award: (1) The original contribution must have appeared in a publication at least five years before the year of the award, (2) One of the articles related to this contribution and authored by this candidate must have appeared in the proceedings of SIROCCO.

The award was presented for the first time in 2009.

== Winners ==
Year	Recipient	Topic	Ref.
2009	Nicola Santoro	Analysis of properties of labeled graphs	
2010	Jean-Claude Bermond	Impact of structure of networks on the efficiency of parallel or distributed algorithms	
2011	David Peleg	Local computing, robot computing, dynamic monopolies, sparse spanners, compact routing and labeling schemes	
2012	Roger Wattenhofer	Distributed approximation	
2013	Andrzej Pelc	Communication paradigms for information dissemination	
2014	Pierre Fraigniaud	On the role of identities in local distributed computing	
2015	Michel Raynal	Condition-based approach to solving agreement problems	
2016	Masafumi Yamashita	Distributed computing with autonomous mobile robots	
2017	Shmuel Zaks	Algorithmic aspects of optical networks	
2018	Zvi Lotker	Theory of wireless and social networks	
2019	Paola Flocchini	Sense of direction in labeled graphs and analysis of asynchronous systems of mobile agents	
2020	Amos Korman	Computational aspects of biological systems	
2021	Friedhelm Meyer-auf-der-Heide	Continuous strategies for swarms of mobile robots	
2022	Christian Scheideler	Robust and efficient overlay networks	
2023	Boaz Patt-Shamir	Distributed computing under bandwidth limitations	
2024	Shay Kutten	Distributed computing and proof-labeling schemes	
2025	Sergio Rajsbaum	Pioneering advancements in the theory of distributed computing	
2026	Dariusz (Darek) Kowalski	Pioneering advancements on distributed protocols on shared channels	

== See also ==
- List of computer science awards
