= Paola Mello =

Italian computer scientist (born 1958)

Paola Mello (born 1958) is an Italian computer scientist whose research in artificial intelligence concerns topics including process mining, event monitoring, and logic programming, with applications in health, transportation, and business. She is a professor in the Department of Computer Science and Engineering at the University of Bologna, and the former president of the Italian Association for Artificial Intelligence.

== Education and career ==
Mello was born in Bologna in 1958. She earned a laurea in electrical engineering from the University of Bologna in 1982, and completed a doctorate there in 1989, in electrical engineering and computer science.

She has worked at the University of Bologna since 1983, with the exception of short stints at the University of Bari and University of Ferrara. She headed the Department of Computer Science and Engineering from 2012 to 2015.

She was president of the Italian Association for Artificial Intelligence (AIxIA) from 2010 to 2014.

== Recognition ==
Mello was named to the Academy of Sciences of the Institute of Bologna in 2016. She is a Fellow of the European Association for Artificial Intelligence, elected in 2017.
