= Thomas Feichtner =

Austrian industrial designer

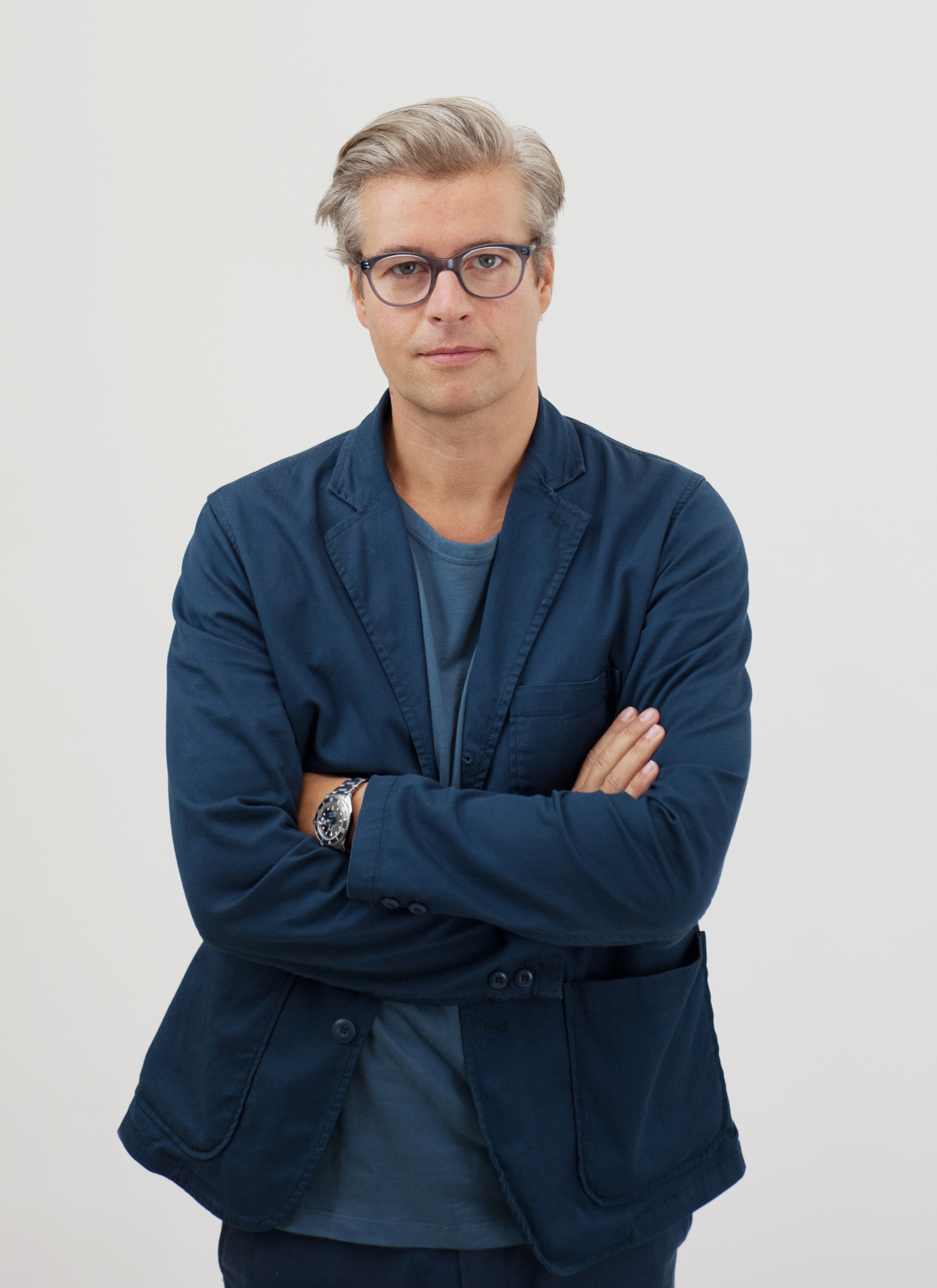
- Born: 1970 (age 54–55); Vitória, Brazil
- Occupation: industrial designer
- Website: www.thomasfeichtner.com

Thomas Feichtner (born 1970) is a Brazilian-born Austrian industrial designer.

== Life ==
Thomas Feichtner was born to Austrian parents in Vitória, Brazil, in 1970. After attending school in Linz, Austria, and Düsseldorf, Germany, he studied and completed a degree in industrial design at the University of Art and Industrial Design Linz, from 1990 to 1995, where he later taught from 2002 to 2005. In 1997 Feichtner founded his own design studio and initially designed sports equipment and industrial goods. Starting in 2005, he increasingly began to design products for Austrian fabricators and traditional crafters, along with experimental individual pieces for exhibitions. Between 2001 and 2009, he was a partner in a visual communications agency in Linz and Vienna. His son Ferdinand was born in 2008. Feichter has been a professor of product design at the Muthesius Academy of Art in Kiel, Germany, from 2009 to 2014. With his wife Simone Feichtner, he lives and works in Vienna, Austria.

== Works ==
Even as a student, Thomas Feichtner designed numerous products for the Austrian sporting industry, like skateboards and snowboards for Heavy Tools or ski bindings for Tyrolia and Fischer. He later designed skis for Head and Blizzard. In the area of visual communications, Feichtner worked for companies like Swarovski, Adidas Eyewear, European Capital of Culture or the British-Israeli designer Ron Arad. After his early successes as an industrial designer, Feichtner turned to experimental product design in 2005, working with traditional fabricators such as J. & L. Lobmeyr, Porzellanmanufaktur Augarten, Carl Mertens, Neue Wiener Werkstätten, Wiener Silbermanufactur and Stamm. He has also completed freelance projects in cooperation with Vitra und FSB. His works have found their way into major design collections, like that of MAK – Austrian Museum for Applied Arts/Contemporary Arts.

== Awards ==
- reddot design award 2010, Design Zentrum Nordrhein-Westfalen, Essen, Germany.
- European Design Award 2009, IDA International Council of Graphic Design Associations, Athens, Greece.
- CCA Venus Award 2009, Venus in Bronze, Creativ Club Austria, Vienna.
- Josef Binder Award in Silber 2008, Design Austria, Graphic and Product Design Association, Vienna, Austria.
- Design Award of the Federal Republic of Germany 2007, German Design Council, Frankfurt, Germany.
- Global Awards 2006 Finalist, International Awards Competition, New York Festivals, New York, USA.
- Josef Binder Award 2006, design Austria, Graphic and Product Design Association, Vienna, Austria.
- Design Award of the Federal Republic of Germany 2005, German Design Council, Frankfurt, Germany.
- Josef Binder Award 2004, design Austria, Graphic and Product Design Association, Vienna, Austria.
- BIO19, Biennal of Industrial Design Ljubljana, 2004, Architecture Museum of Ljubljana. Slovenia.
- Gustav Klimt Prize 2004, Vienna, Austria.
- reddot design award 2004, Design Zentrum Nordrhein-Westfalen, Essen, Germany.
- International Advertising Festival Cannes 2003, Shortlist Cannes, Print and Outdoor, Cannes, France.
- IF Design Award 2002, International Forum Design Hannover, Germany.
- Designpreis Schweiz 2001, Design Center AG, Langenthal, Switzerland.
- IF Design Award 2001, International Forum Design Hannover, Germany.
- CCA Venus Award 2000, Venus in Bronze, Creativ Club Austria, Vienna, Austria.
