= Éditions Ellipses =

- Status: Independent
- Founded: 1973
- Founders: Jean-Pierre Bénézet
- Country of origin: France
- Headquarters location: 8/10 rue la Quintinie; 75740 Paris
- Key people: Brieuc Bénézet (CEO)
- Nonfiction topics: Preparation for competitive exams, history, philosophy, Methods of Languages, French as a foreign language, economics, law, medicine
- Official website: https://www.editions-ellipses.fr/

Éditions Ellipses was founded in France in 1973 by Jean-Pierre Bénézet. It is classified as an independent publishing house. The current CEO is Brieuc Bénézet.

Ellipses started out publishing student examination materials for secondary education in France and higher education in France, including the Baccalaureat, CAPES, and Aggregation exams and also entrance examinations for the classes préparatoires and the Grandes Écoles. The company also publishes resources for learning about twenty modern and ancient languages.

In 2007, Ellipses ranked among the top two hundred French publishing houses. Today the company publishes about 12,000 authors.
