= Driny =

Cave in Slovakia

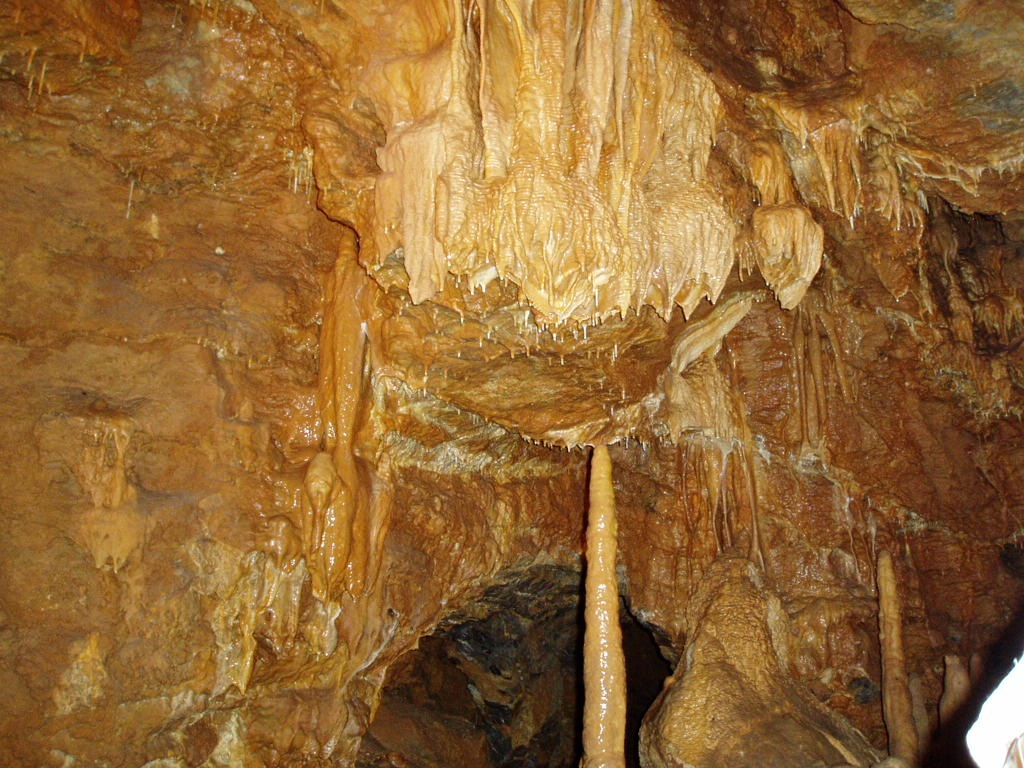
- Interior of the cave, May 2007

- Location within Slovakia
- Location: Smolenice, Slovakia
- Coordinates: 48°30′2″N 17°24′14″E
- Length: 636 m (2,087 ft)
- Geology: Karst
- Access: with guide

Driny is a limestone cave in West Slovakia in the Little Carpathians Mountains. It is located around 2 kilometres (1.2 mi) southwest of the village of Smolenice, and the cave's entrance is 399 metres (1,309 ft) above sea level.

The first attempt to enter the cave was made by Prussian soldiers, who were camping nearby during the Austro-Prussian War. It was finally explored in 1929, and in 1934 the first 175-metre-long (574 ft) route was opened. In 1950 other parts of the cave were explored and in 1959, the cave was reopened. The cave was declared a nature monument in 1968 and became part of the newly designated Little Carpathians Protected Landscape Area in 1976. The total explored length is 636 metres (2,087 ft), 550 metres (1,800 ft) are open to the public.
