= Symposium on Parallelism in Algorithms and Architectures =

- Abbreviation: SPAA
- Discipline: Parallel computing and distributed computing

Publication details
- Publisher: ACM
- History: 1989–
- Frequency: annual

The ACM Symposium on Parallelism in Algorithms and Architectures (SPAA) is an academic conference in the fields of parallel computing and distributed computing. It is sponsored by the Association for Computing Machinery special interest groups SIGACT and SIGARCH, and it is organized in cooperation with the European Association for Theoretical Computer Science (EATCS).

== History ==
SPAA was first organised on 18–21 June 1989, in Santa Fe, New Mexico, United States. In 1989–2002, SPAA was known as Symposium on Parallel Algorithms and Architectures. In 2003, the name changed to Symposium on Parallelism in Algorithms and Architectures to reflect the extended scope of the conference.

In 2003, 2007, and 2023, SPAA was part of the Federated Computing Research Conference (FCRC). SPAA and the ACM Symposium on Principles of Distributed Computing (PODC) were co-located or jointly held in 1998, 2005, 2009, 2013, 2017, 2023, 2024, and 2026.

== See also ==
- The list of distributed computing conferences contains other academic conferences in parallel and distributed computing.
- The list of computer science conferences contains other academic conferences in computer science.
