= Charles R. Moore (computer engineer) =

American computer scientist

Charles R. (Chuck) Moore
- Born: March 13, 1961
- Died: April 29, 2012
- Known for: Computer Architecture
- Awards: AMD Corporate Fellow; IBM Master Inventor; IBM Academy of Technology
- Scientific career
- Fields: Computer Science
- Institutions: IBM; Advanced Micro Devices

Charles R. Moore (also known as Chuck Moore) was an American computer engineer noted for his research on computer architecture. He spent much of his career working at IBM, where he was chief engineer and project co-lead for the PowerPC 601 microprocessor. He then led the POWER4 Chip Architecture project.

== Biography ==
Moore received a B.S. degree in electrical engineering from Rensselaer Polytechnic Institute in 1983. He received a M.S. in Electrical Engineering from University of Texas at Austin in 1991.

From 1984 to 2001, Moore worked at IBM Corporation in Austin, Texas, with increasing responsibility and leadership on the design and development of IBM microprocessors, including PowerPC 601, POWER4, and others. After a stint at Chicory Systems, a startup in the mobile computing space, he returned to University of Texas at Austin as a senior research fellow. In 2004, he joined Advanced Micro Devices, where he served as chief engineer for the “Bulldozer” processor microarchitecture, and ultimately held the position of corporate fellow. In 2007, Moore gave a plenary talk at the ACM Federated Computing Research Conferences (FCRC). In 2008, he gave a keynote address at the IEEE/ACM International Symposium on Microarchitecture.

In 2012, Moore died of pancreatic cancer. and his career was memorialized in an IEEE Micro article
