= Smolenice Castle =

- Smolenice, Slovakia
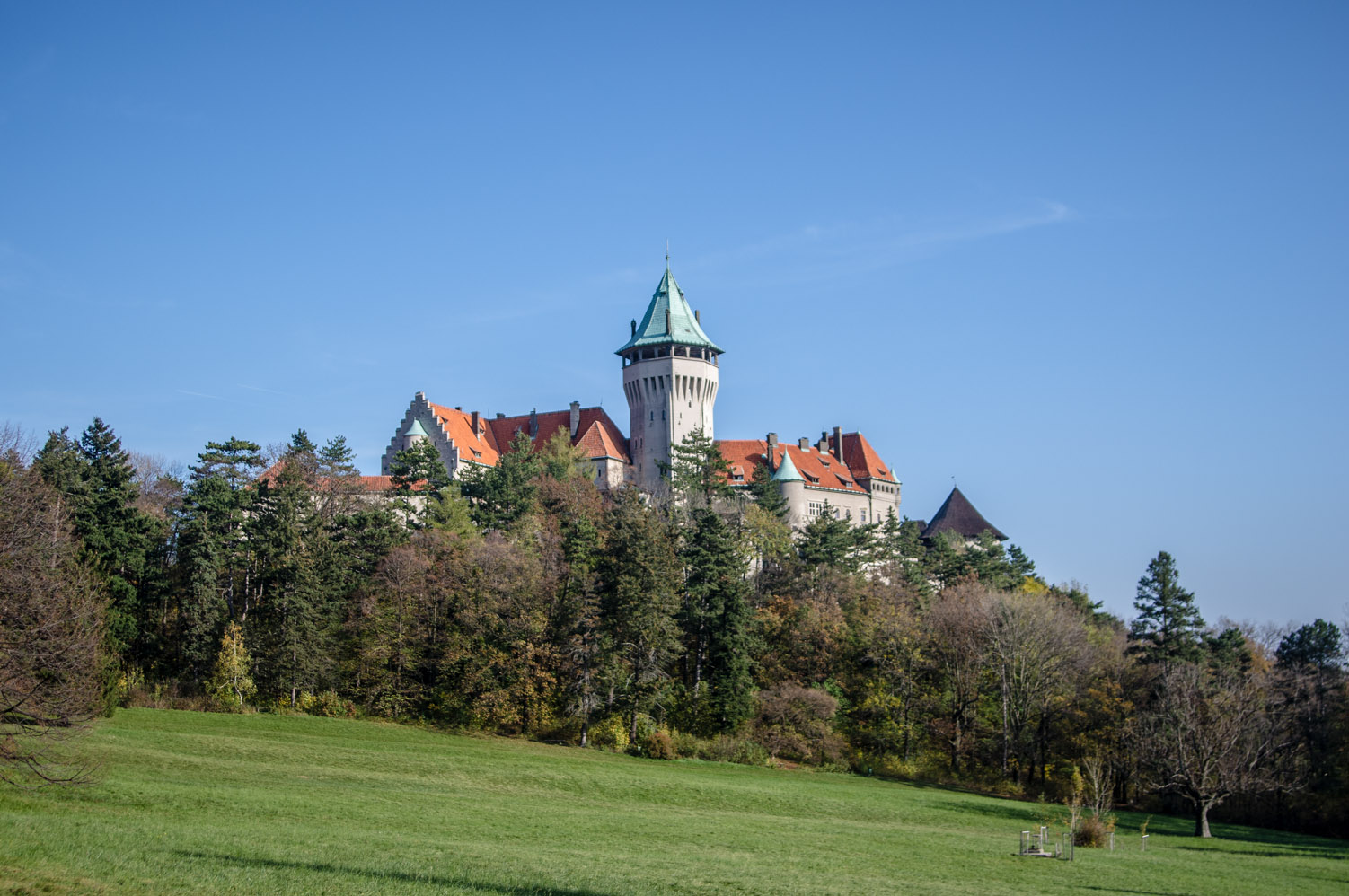
- Smolenice castle

Location
- Location in Slovakia
- Location within Slovakia
- Coordinates: 48.513611°N 17.432222°E

Smolenice Castle (Slovak: Smolenický zámok) is a castle in the eastern slope of the Little Carpathians, near the town of Smolenice, Slovakia.

== History ==
Smolenice Castle was built in the 15th century, but it was destroyed during Rákóczi's War of Independence and the Napoleonic Wars. In 1777, Count János Pálffy from Pezinok inherited Smolenice but did not reside in the castle due to its poor condition and lack of money for rebuilding it. The castle was only rebuilt in the 20th century, by order of Count József Pálffy. The architect Jozef Hubert designed the new castle by using Kreuzenstein castle near Vienna as a model, and the works were controlled by the architect Pavol Reiter from Bavaria. During its construction there were masters from Italy, Germany, Austria and Hungary, and 60 workmen from Smolenice and nearby villages. The main building has two wings and a tower, and is made of ferroconcrete.

The castle was damaged in the spring of 1945 during World War II, and in that same year the state became the owner of it. Some reconstructions have been made after 1950, and since June 26, 1953 the castle is the property of the Slovak Academy of Sciences. The castle serves now as a conference centre, and it is only opened to the public in the months of July and August.

== See also ==
- List of castles in Slovakia
- Little Carpathians

== Sources ==
- Smolenice Castle (in Slovak)
