= ACM SIGACT =

Association for Computing Machinery (ACM) special interest group

ACM SIGACT or SIGACT is the Association for Computing Machinery Special Interest Group on Algorithms and Computation Theory, whose purpose is support of research in theoretical computer science. It was founded in 1968 by Patrick C. Fischer.

== Publications ==
SIGACT publishes a quarterly print newsletter, SIGACT News. Its online version, SIGACT News Online, is available since 1996 for SIGACT members, with unrestricted access to some features.

== Conferences ==
SIGACT sponsors or has sponsored several annual conferences.

- COLT: Conference on Learning Theory, until 1999
- PODC: ACM Symposium on Principles of Distributed Computing (jointly sponsored by SIGOPS)
- PODS: ACM Symposium on Principles of Database Systems (jointly sponsored by SIGAI and SIGACT)
- POPL: ACM Symposium on Principles of Programming Languages
- SOCG: ACM Symposium on Computational Geometry (jointly sponsored by SIGGRAPH), until 2014
- SODA: ACM/SIAM Symposium on Discrete Algorithms (jointly sponsored by the Society for Industrial and Applied Mathematics). Two annual workshops held in conjunction with SODA also have the same joint sponsorship:
  - ALENEX: Workshop on Algorithms and Experiments
  - ANALCO: Workshop on Analytic Algorithms and Combinatorics
- SPAA: ACM Symposium on Parallelism in Algorithms and Architectures
- STOC: ACM Symposium on the Theory of Computing

COLT, PODC, PODS, POPL, SODA, and STOC are all listed as highly cited venues by both citeseerx and libra.

== Awards and prizes ==
- Gödel Prize, for outstanding papers in theoretical computer science (sponsored jointly with EATCS)
- Donald E. Knuth Prize, for outstanding contributions to the foundations of computer science (sponsored jointly with IEEE Computer Society's Technical Committee on the Mathematical Foundations of Computing)
- Edsger W. Dijkstra Prize in distributed computing (sponsored jointly with SIGOPS, EATCS, and companies)
- Paris Kanellakis Theory and Practice Award, for theoretical accomplishments of significant and demonstrable effect on the practice of computing (ACM Award co-sponsored by SIGACT)
- Eugene L. Lawler Award for Humanitarian Contributions within Computer Science and Informatics (ACM Award co-sponsored by SIGACT)
- Danny Lewin Best Student Paper Award
- Best Paper Award for ACM STOC and IEEE FOCS conference papers
- ACM SIGACT Distinguished Service Award
