= Dmitry Feichtner-Kozlov =

Russian-German mathematician

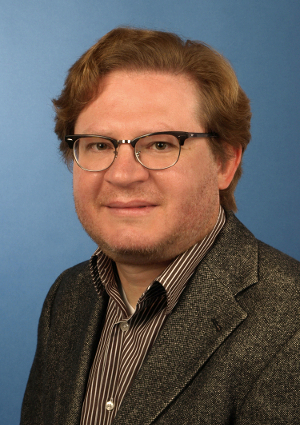
Dmitry Feichtner-Kozlov

Dmitry N. Feichtner-Kozlov (Russian: Дмитрий Фейхтнер-Козлов; born 16 December 1972, in Tomsk, Russia) is a Russian-German mathematician.

He works in the field of Applied and Combinatorial Topology, where he publishes under the name Dmitry N. Kozlov.

== Biography ==
Feichtner-Kozlov obtained his Ph.D. from the Royal Institute of Technology, Stockholm in 1996, with thesis Extremal Combinatorics, Weighting Algorithms, and Topology of Subspaces Arrangements written under the direction of Anders Björner. In 2004, after longer stays at the Mathematical Sciences Research Institute in Berkeley, California, the Massachusetts Institute of Technology, the Institute for Advanced Study in Princeton, New Jersey, the University of Washington in Seattle, the University of Bern, and the Royal Institute of Technology, he assumed the position of assistant professor at ETH Zurich, Switzerland.

Since 2007, he works at the University of Bremen, Germany, where he holds the Chair of Algebra and Geometry, and is the director of the Institute for Algebra, Geometry, Topology and their applications.

Feichtner-Kozlov has done research on various topics, such as: topological methods in combinatorics, including applications to graph colorings; combinatorially defined polyhedral and cell complexes; combinatorial structures in geometry and topology, such as stratifications and compactifications of spaces; combinatorial aspects of chain complexes, such as coboundary expansion. He has also done interdisciplinary work, e.g., developing rigorous mathematical methods in theoretical distributed computing.

Feichtner-Kozlov is the recipient of the following prizes: Wallenberg prize 2003, Goran Gustafsson prize 2004, European Prize in Combinatorics 2005. The book "Distributed Computing through Combinatorial Topology", which he wrote together with computer scientists Maurice Herlihy and Sergio Rajsbaum has been selected as a Notable Book on the Best of Computing 2013 list by the Association for Computing Machinery.

He is a managing editor of the Journal of Applied and Computational Topology, published by Springer-Verlag.

== Personal life ==
Feichtner-Kozlov is married to Eva-Maria Feichtner, with whom he academically collaborates frequently.

== Selected publications ==
- Herlihy, Maurice; Kozlov, Dmitry N.; Rajsbaum, Sergio (2014). Distributed computing through combinatorial topology. Amsterdam: Elsevier. ISBN 978-0-12-404578-1. MR 3292637. OCLC 864899516.
- Kozlov, Dmitry (2008). Combinatorial Algebraic Topology. Algorithms and Computation in Mathematics. Vol. 21. Berlin, Heidelberg: Springer. doi:10.1007/978-3-540-71962-5. ISBN 978-3-540-71961-8. MR 2361455.
- Babson, Eric; Kozlov, Dmitry N. (2007). "Proof of the Lovász conjecture". Annals of Mathematics. 165 (3): 965–1007. arXiv:math/0402395. doi:10.4007/annals.2007.165.965. MR 2335799. S2CID 46009535.
- Kozlov, Dmitry N. (2007). "Chromatic numbers, morphism complexes, and Stiefel-Whitney characteristic classes". In Miller, Ezra; Reiner, Victor; Sturmfels, Bernd (eds.). Geometric Combinatorics. IAS/Park City Mathematics Series. Vol. 13. Providence, RI: American Mathematical Society. pp. 249–315. arXiv:math/0505563. doi:10.1090/pcms/013/06. ISBN 978-0-8218-3736-8. MR 2383129. S2CID 5741947.

== See also ==
- Discrete Morse theory
- Topological combinatorics
