= Shlomo Moran =

Israeli computer scientist

- שלמה מורן
- Born: 1947 (age 78–79)
- Education: Technion – Israel Institute of Technology
- Known for: Arthur–Merlin protocols, interactive proof systems SMAWK algorithm
- Awards: Gödel Prize (1993)
- Scientific career
- Fields: Computer Science
- Workplaces: Technion – Israel Institute of Technology
- Doctoral advisor: Azaria Paz

Shlomo Moran (Hebrew: שלמה מורן; born 1947) is an Israeli computer scientist, the Bernard Elkin Chair in Computer Science at the Technion – Israel Institute of Technology in Haifa, Israel.

Moran received his Ph.D. in 1979 from the Technion, under the supervision of Azaria Paz; his dissertation was entitled "NP Optimization Problems and their Approximation".

Several PhD students of Moran joined the academia as well, including Shlomi Dolev, Ilan Gronau, Shay Kutten, and Gadi Taubenfeld.

In 1993 he shared the Gödel Prize with László Babai, Shafi Goldwasser, Silvio Micali, and Charles Rackoff for their work on Arthur–Merlin protocols and interactive proof systems.
