= International Symposium on Distributed Computing =

- Abbreviation: DISC
- Discipline: Distributed computing

Publication details
- Publisher: LZI LIPIcs; Springer LNCS
- History: 1985–
- Frequency: annual (since 1989)

The International Symposium on Distributed Computing (DISC) is an annual academic conference for refereed presentations, whose focus is the theory, design, analysis, implementation, and application of distributed systems and networks. The Symposium is organized in association with the European Association for Theoretical Computer Science (EATCS). It and the ACM Symposium on Principles of Distributed Computing (PODC) are the two premier conferences in distributed computing research.

The Edsger W. Dijkstra Prize in Distributed Computing is presented alternately at DISC and at the PODC.

== History ==
DISC dates back to 1985, when it began as a biannual Workshop on Distributed Algorithms on Graphs (WDAG); it became annual in 1989. The name changed to the present one in 1998.

While the first WDAG was held in Ottawa, Canada in 1985, since then WDAG/DISC has been organised primarily in European locations, one exception being WDAG 1992 in Haifa, Israel. In September 2010, DISC returned to North America for the first time since 1985: 24th DISC took place in Cambridge, Massachusetts, United States. In the same year, its North American sister conference PODC was held in Europe (Zurich) for the first time in its history.

== See also ==
- The list of distributed computing conferences contains other academic conferences in distributed computing.
- The list of computer science conferences contains other academic conferences in computer science.
