= International Colloquium on Structural Information and Communication Complexity =

- Abbreviation: SIROCCO
- Discipline: Distributed computing

Publication details
- Publisher: Springer LNCS
- History: 1994–
- Frequency: annual (since 1994)

The International Colloquium on Structural Information and Communication Complexity (SIROCCO) is an annual academic conference with refereed presentations, in the field of Distributed Computing with a special focus on the interplay between structural knowledge and communication complexity in distributed/decentralized systems. The Colloquium was started in 1994 with the idea of promoting new and unconventional ideas in distributed computing; one of the aims of the organizers is to provide a venue for informal discussions in a relaxed environment.

The Prize for Innovation in Distributed Computing is presented annually at SIROCCO "to recognize individuals whose research contributions expanded the collective investigative horizon" in the areas of interest to the conference.

Since 2013, SIROCCO also awards a Best Student Paper Award and/or a Best Paper Award to recognize the best publication among (student-authored or all) accepted articles each year.

== History ==
SIROCCO was held for the first time in 1994 at Carleton University in Ottawa, Ontario, Canada and the proceedings were published by Carleton Scientific. The next year (1995) SIROCCO was held in Greece and since then the conference has always been held in European locations except in 2014 when it was held in Japan and in 2018 when it was held in Israel. The 2018 edition of the conference celebrated the 25 year jubilee of the SIROCCO conference. The 30th edition of the conference was held in Avila, Spain in 2023.

Since 2004, pre-conference or post-conference proceedings of SIROCCO have been published by Springer as part of the Lecture Notes in Computer Science series.

Reviews of the SIROCCO conference have appeared in the year-ending issues of the ACM SIGACT News Distributed Computing Column in 2001, 2005, 2009, 2011, 2012, 2015, 2016, and 2017.

== Locations ==
- 2024: Salerno, Italy
- 2023: Alcalá_de_Henares, Spain
- 2022: Paderborn, Germany
- 2021: Wrocław, Poland(Online)
- 2020: Paderborn, Germany(Online)
- 2019: L'Aquila, Italy
- 2018: Ma'ale HaHamisha, Israel
- 2017: Porquerolles, France
- 2016: Helsinki, Finland
- 2015: Montserrat, Spain
- 2014: Hida Takayama, Japan
- 2013: Ischia, Italy
- 2012: Reykjavík, Iceland
- 2011: Gdańsk, Poland
- 2010: Sirince, Turkey
- 2009: Piran, Slovenia
- 2008: Villars-sur-Ollon, Switzerland
- 2007: Castiglioncello, Italy
- 2006: Chester, UK
- 2005: Mont Saint-Michel, France
- 2004: Smolenice Castle, Slovakia
- 2003: Umeå, Sweden
- 2002: Andros, Greece
- 2001: Vall de Núria, Spain
- 2000: L'Aquila, Italy
- 1999: Lacanau, France
- 1998: Amalfi, Italy
- 1997: Ascona, Switzerland
- 1996: Siena, Italy
- 1995: Olympia, Greece
- 1994: Ottawa, Ontario, Canada

== See also ==
- The list of distributed computing conferences contains other academic conferences in distributed computing.
- The list of computer science conferences contains other academic conferences in computer science.
