= Research Institute of Computer Science and Random Systems =

Joint computer science research center in Rennes in Brittany

- Institut de recherche en informatique et systèmes aléatoires
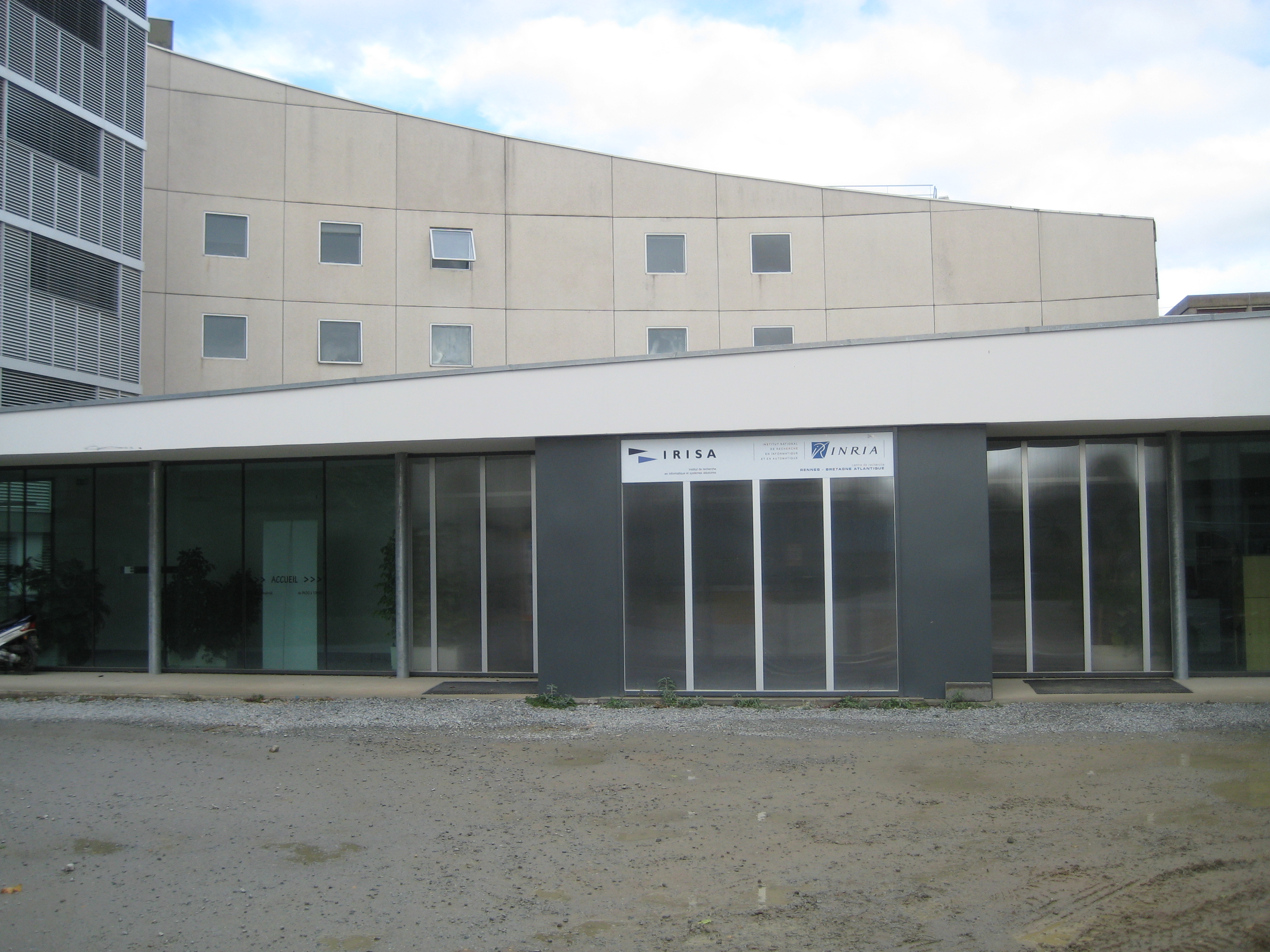
- Abbreviation: IRISA
- Formation: 1975; 51 years ago
- Type: Unité mixte de recherche
- Location: Rennes, France
- Coordinates: 48°06′58″N 1°38′21″W
- Website: www.irisa.fr

The Research Institute of Computer Science and Random Systems (French: Institut de recherche en informatique et systèmes aléatoires; IRISA) is a joint computer science research center of CNRS, University of Rennes 1, ENS Rennes, INSA Rennes and Inria, in Rennes in Brittany. It is one of the eight Inria research centers.

Created in 1975 as a spin-off of the University of Rennes 1, IRISA was formed by merging the young computer science department with a few mathematicians, specifically probabilists, including Michel Métivier, who became the first president of IRISA.

In 2016, IRISA comprised around 750 people (researchers, doctoral students, engineers, technicians and administrators) and 41 research teams. In 2018, the laboratory, through its director Jean-Marc Jézéquel, protested against the measures to protect research in public laboratories imposed by the French government, which were considered inadequate.

Research topics span from theoretical computer science, such as formal languages, formal methods, and other mathematically oriented fields like information theory, optimization, and complex systems, to application-driven areas like bioinformatics, image and video compression, handwriting recognition, computer graphics, medical imaging, and content-based image retrieval.

== See also ==
- French space program
