= AofA—International Meeting on Combinatorial, Probabilistic, and Asymptotic Methods in the Analysis of Algorithms =

Annual meeting in computer science

AofA, the International Meeting on Probabilistic, Combinatorial and Asymptotic Methods for the Analysis of Algorithms is an academic meeting that has been held regularly since 1993 in the field of computer science, focusing on mathematical methods from analytic combinatorics and probability for the study of properties of algorithms and large combinatorial structures. In early years, different formal names were used, but the meeting and associated community of researchers has always been known as AofA.

== Structure ==
The tradition is a weeklong meeting, alternating between invited workshops and open refereed conferences with contributed papers chosen by a program committee. The meetings feature invited presentations from senior researchers, about half from within the community and half from related research areas. Since 2014, the inaugural lecture at each conference has been delivered by the winner of the Flajolet Lecture Prize.

== Publishing ==
The proceedings of the conferences are now published by the Schloss Dagstuhl Leibniz Center for Informatics in the open access series Leibniz International Proceedings in Informatics. The proceedings are freely available from the conference website and also from DROPS, the Dagstuhl Research Online Publication Server. The proceedings of prior editions have been published in several venues, and special issues of several journals have been devoted to papers from AofA conferences.

== Related meetings ==
From 2002 to 2008, the community organized a second meeting each even-numbered year, the Colloquium on Mathematics and Computer Science (MathInfo). Due to overlap among participants and content, the community decided to merge the two meetings to the present format. From 2003 to 2019, the AofA community also organized the one-day ANALCO meetings at the SODA conference.

The community has also organized symposia and special journal issues to celebrate Donald Knuth’s 1,000,000_{2} birthday, to celebrate Philippe Flajolet’s 60th birthday, to honor the memory of Phillipe Flajolet, and to celebrate Don Knuth’s 80th birthday.

AofA conferences are indexed by several bibliographic databases, including the DBLP, Google Scholar and The Collection of Computer Science Bibliographies.

== History ==
AofA meetings have been held regularly since 1993 in Europe and North America, usually in the summer. Refereed conferences are in bold.

- 1993 Schloss Dagstuhl, Germany. Proceedings.
- 1995 Schloss Dagstuhl, Germany. Proceedings.
- 1997 Schloss Dagstuhl, Germany. Proceedings.
- 1998 Princeton, NJ, USA. Proceedings.
- 1999 Barcelona, Spain.
- 2000 Krynica Morska, Poland. Proceedings
- 2000 **Versailles, France**. MathInfo Proceedings.
- 2001 Tatihou, France.
- 2002 Strobl, Austria. Proceedings.
- 2002 **Versailles, France**. MathInfo Proceedings.
- 2003 San Miniato, Italy (Speakers: Ralph Neininger; Luc Devroye; Brigitte Vallée; Philippe Flajolet; Brendan McKay)
- 2004 MSRI, Berkeley, USA (Speakers: Persi Diaconis; Philippe Flajolet; Donald Knuth; Richard M. Karp). Proceedings.
- 2004 **Vienna, Austria**. MathInfo Proceedings.
- 2005 Barcelona, Spain (Speakers: Alan M. Frieze; Gábor Lugosi; Nicholas Pippenger; Helmut Prodinger; Robert Sedgewick). Proceedings.
- 2006 Alden Biesen, Belgium. (Speakers: Philippe Chassaing; Erik Demaine; Philippe Flajolet; Hsien- Kuei Hwang; Svante Janson; Guy Louchard; Bruce Reed).
- **2006 Nancy, France**. MathInfo Proceedings.
- 2007 Juan-les-pins, France (Speakers: Persi Diaconis; Madhu Sudan; Wojciech Szpankowski; Mireille Bousquet-Melou; Luc Devroye; Philippe Flajolet). Proceedings
- **2008 Maresias, Brazil**. (Speakers: John Dixon; Gaston Gonnet; Jean-François Marckert; Conrado Martínez; Brendan McKay; Andrea Montanari; Robert Sedgewick; Brigitte Vallée)
- **2008 Blaubeuren, Germany**. MathInfo Proceedings.
- 2009 Fréjus, France. (Speakers: Brigitte Chauvin; Jérémie Bouttier; Bernhard Gittenberger; Philippe Jacquet; Marc Noy; Uwe Roesler; David Sankoff; Gilles Schaeffer)
- **2010 Vienna, Austria**. (Speakers: Noga Alon; Yuliy Baryshnikov; Daniel Panario; Oliver Riordan; Peter Winkler). Proceedings.
- 2011 Będlewo, Poland. (Speakers: Julien Clément; Jim Fill; Hsein-Kuei Hwang; Piotr Indyk; Michal Karonski; Marc Mézard; Ralph Neininger; Angelica Steger))
- **2012 Montreal, Canada**. (Speakers: Amin Coja-Oghlan; Michael Drmota; Svante Janson; Claire Mathieu; Avi Wigderson). Proceedings.
- 2013 Menorca, Spain. (Speakers: Joachim Buhmann; Rudolf Grübel; Mihyun Kang; Gabor Lugosi; Cyril Nicaud; Konstantinos Panagiotou; Michèle Soria; Alfredo Viola)
- **2014 Paris, France**. (Flajolet lecture: Donald Knuth. Speakers: Manuel Kauers; Colin McDiarmid; Cristopher Moore; Marc Noy; Gilles Schaeffer). Proceedings.
- 2015 Strobl, Austria. (Speakers: Nicolas Broutin; Christina Goldschmidt; Martin Dietzfelbinger; Elchanan Mossel; Markus Nebel; Alois Panholzer; Carsten Schneider; Lutz Warnke)
- **2016 Krakow, Poland**. (Flajolet lecture: Robert Sedgewick. Speakers: Jean Bertoin; Pawel Blasiak; Hsien- Kuei Hwang; Wojciech Szpankowski; Nick Wormald. Proceedings.
- 2017 Princeton, NJ, USA. (Speakers: Sourav Chatterjee; Michael Fuchs; Cecilia Holmgren; Marni Mishna; Dan Romik; Bruno Salvy; Neil J. A. Sloane; Perla Sousi)
- **2018 Uppsala, Sweden**. (Flajolet lecture: Luc Devroye. Speakers: Louigi Addario-Berry; Béla Bollobás; Karen Gunderson; Olle Häggström; Svante Janson; Mihyun Kang; Mark Daniel Ward). Proceedings.
- 2019 Luminy, France. (Speakers: Alin Bostan; Valentin Féray; Peter Mörters; Cyril Nicaud; Robin Pemantle; Dana Randall; Andrea Sportiello; Lenka Zdeborová)
- **2020 Klagenfurt, Austria**
- 2021 Klagenfurt, Austria (Virtual). (Panel discussion: "The Legacy of Philippe Flajolet: Ten Years Later" with the first four Flajolet Lecturers; Speakers: James A. Fill, Malwina Luczak, Andrew Rechnitzer)
- **2022 Philadelphia, USA**. (Flajolet lectures: Wojciech Szpankowski and Svante Janson. Speakers: TBA).
