= Michael A. Bender =

American computer scientist

- Education: Harvard University, A.B. (1992); École Normale Supérieure de Lyon D.E.A. (1993); Harvard University, PhD (1998)
- Scientific career
- Fields: Computer science
- Workplaces: Stony Brook University
- Thesis: New Algorithms and Metrics for Scheduling (1998)
- Doctoral advisor: Michael O. Rabin

Michael A. Bender is an American computer scientist, known for his work in cache-oblivious algorithms, lowest common ancestor data structures, scheduling (computing), and pebble games. He is David R. Smith Leading Scholar professor of computer science at Stony Brook University, and a co-founder of storage technology startup company Tokutek.

== Early life and education ==
Bender obtained his PhD in computer science in 1998 from Harvard University under the supervision of Michael O. Rabin.

== Research contributions ==
After completing his Ph.D., he co-founded Tokutek. He was program chair of the 19th ACM Symposium on Parallelism in Algorithms and Architectures (SPAA 2006). The cache-oblivious B-tree data structures studied by Bender, Demaine, and Farach-Colton beginning in 2000 became the basis for the fractal tree index used by Tokutek's products TokuDB and TokuMX.

== Awards and honors ==
In 2012 Bender won the Simon Imre Test of Time award at LATIN. In 2015, his paper "Two-Level Main Memory Co-Design: Multi-Threaded Algorithmic Primitives, Analysis, and Simulation" won the Best Paper award at IPDPS. In 2016, his paper "Optimizing Every Operation in a Write-optimized File System" won the Best Paper award at FAST.

In 2020, Bender was elected an ACM Distinguished Member.

In 2026, Bender was elevated to IEEE fellow "for contributions to the theory of data structures and their application to storage systems".

== Selected publications ==
- Bender, Michael A.; Farach-Colton, Martin (2000), "The LCA problem revisited" (PDF), in Gonnet, Gaston H.; Panario, Daniel; Viola, Alfredo (eds.), LATIN 2000: Theoretical Informatics, 4th Latin American Symposium, Punta del Este, Uruguay, April 10-14, 2000, Proceedings, Lecture Notes in Computer Science, vol. 1776, Springer, pp. 88–94, doi:10.1007/10719839_9, ISBN 978-3-540-67306-4.
- Bender, Michael A.; Demaine, Erik D.; Farach-Colton, Martin (2005), "Cache-oblivious B-trees", SIAM Journal on Computing, 35 (2): 341–358, doi:10.1137/S0097539701389956, MR 2191447. Previously announced at FOCS 2000.
- Bender, Michael A.; Chakrabarti, Soumen; Muthukrishnan, Muthu (1998), "Flow and stretch metrics for scheduling continuous job streams", 9th Annual ACM-SIAM Symposium on Discrete Algorithms SODA '98., CiteSeerX 10.1.1.44.7577.
- Bender, Michael A.; Fernandez, Antonio; Ron, Dana; Sahai, Amit; Vadhan, Salil (1998). "The power of a pebble". Proceedings of the thirtieth annual ACM symposium on Theory of computing - STOC '98. pp. 269–278. doi:10.1145/276698.276759. ISBN 0-89791-962-9. S2CID 47095697..
