= Michael Bender =

Michael Bender may refer to:

- Michael A. Bender, American computer scientist
- Michael C. Bender, American journalist and author
- Michael L. Bender (born 1942), American attorney, former Chief Justice of the Colorado Supreme Court

== See also ==
- Michael Binder (born 1969), retired Austrian football midfielder
