= Alice Barkan =

American molecular biologist and researcher

- Education: Massachusetts Institute of Technology (B.S.); University of Wisconsin (Ph.D.)
- Known for: genetic machineries in the chloroplast
- Awards: Fellow of the American Association for the Advancement of Science (2017); Fellow of the National Academy of Sciences (2020)
- Scientific career
- Fields: Molecular biology
- Workplaces: University of Oregon
- Doctoral advisor: Janet E. Mertz

Alice Barkan is an American molecular biologist and a professor of biology at the University of Oregon. She is known for her work on chloroplast gene regulation and protein synthesis.

== Education ==
Alice Barkan received her B.S. from Massachusetts Institute of Technology.

In 1983 she completed her Ph.D. from the University of Wisconsin-Madison under the supervision of Janet E. Mertz, with the thesis "Characterization of Simian Virus 40 Late Leader Region Mutants".

== Career and awards ==
Barkan joined the University of Oregon in 1991, where she is currently a professor in the Institute of Molecular Biology.

Barkan was named a fellow of the American Association for the Advancement of Science in 2017.

In 2018, Barkan received the Lawrence Bogorad Award for Excellence in Plant Biology Research from the American Society of Plant Biologists.

Barkan was the recipient of a Faculty Excellence Award from the University of Oregon for 2018–19.

Barkan was elected to the National Academy of Sciences in 2020. Election to the National Academy is one of the highest honors in the scientific field.

The University of Oregon (UO) awarded Barkan an Outstanding Career Award in 2020 to acknowledge not only her scientific accomplishments but also her career contributions in teaching, mentorship and leadership at the UO.

== Research ==
Barkan's research is focused on how nucleus-encoded proteins affect chloroplast gene expression. Experiments from her lab use mutants, primarily in maize (Zea mays) but also Arabidopsis thaliana, to investigate chloroplast mRNA translation and stability, as well as many aspects of RNA maturation, including splicing and editing. Barkan and her colleagues have discovered and studied dozens of plant nuclear genes that encode chloroplast RNA binding proteins that directly affect multiple aspects of RNA metabolism (processing, splicing, translation, stability). The majority of the nucleus-encoded proteins that Barkan has characterized contain pentatricopeptide repeats (PPR). Barkan used the chloroplast to assess RNA and protein interactions, like protein-facilitated group 2 intron splicing and the ways PPR family plays a role in mitochondrial and chloroplast gene expression. Barkan has also discovered and named the CRM (chloroplast RNA splicing and ribosome maturation) domain, which is found in nucleus-encoded proteins required for chloroplast RNA splicing. In 2019, Barkan and colleagues successfully constructed PPR proteins that bound specific RNA sequences in vivo, thus establishing a system for creating targeted protein-RNA interactions.

== Personal life ==
Barkan is a founding member of the musical group Byrdsong Renaissance Consort, with whom she plays the viol and recorder.
