= Malwina Luczak =

Polish-Australian mathematician

Malwina J. Luczak
- Born: Poland
- Education: Nicolaus Copernicus University in Toruń; Keele University; St Catherine's College, Oxford
- Occupation: University of Manchester (professor)

Malwina J. Luczak is a mathematician specializing in probability theory and the theory of random graphs. She is Professor of Applied Probability and Leverhulme International Professor at the Department of Mathematics, University of Manchester.

== Education and research ==
Luczak grew up in Poland, and began her university studies at age 16 at the Nicolaus Copernicus University in Toruń, where she took philology of the English language. However, after her second year studying philology at Keele University in the UK, she decided to switch to mathematics, and enrolled at St Catherine's College, Oxford. After her first year's examinations, she was able to obtain scholarship support, continue her studies and remain at Oxford for doctoral work. She completed her D.Phil. in 2001 with a dissertation, Probability, algorithms and telecommunication systems, supervised by Colin McDiarmid and Dominic Welsh.

She became an assistant lecturer at the Statistical Laboratory at the University of Cambridge and then a reader in mathematics at the London School of Economics. However, in 2010, after failing to receive an expected promotion to professor, she took a professorial position at the University of Sheffield and a five-year Engineering and Physical Sciences Research Council Leadership Fellowship. She moved again to Queen Mary University of London before taking a Professorship in Melbourne in 2017. Most recently, in 2023 she joined the University of Manchester.

== Research ==
Luczak's publications include research on the supermarket model in queueing theory,^{[a]} cores of random graphs,^{[b]} the giant component in random graphs with specified degree distributions,^{[c]} and the Glauber dynamics of the Ising model.^{[d]}

They include:

a.	Luczak, Malwina J.; McDiarmid, Colin (2006), "On the maximum queue length in the supermarket model", Annals of Probability, 34 (2): 493–527, arXiv:math/0605639, Bibcode:2006math......5639L, doi:10.1214/00911790500000710, MR 2223949

b.	Janson, Svante; Luczak, Malwina J. (2007), "A simple solution to the k-core problem", Random Structures & Algorithms, 30 (1–2): 50–62, arXiv:math/0508453, doi:10.1002/rsa.20147, MR 2283221, S2CID 17471505

c.	Janson, Svante; Luczak, Malwina J. (2009), "A new approach to the giant component problem", Random Structures & Algorithms, 34 (2): 197–216, arXiv:0707.1786, doi:10.1002/rsa.20231, MR 2490288, S2CID 7261361

d.	Levin, David A.; Luczak, Malwina J.; Peres, Yuval (2010), "Glauber dynamics for the mean-field Ising model: cut-off, critical power law, and metastability", Probability Theory and Related Fields, 146 (1–2): 223–265, arXiv:0712.0790, doi:10.1007/s00440-008-0189-z, MR 2550363, S2CID 7406436
