= Daniel Kane (mathematician) =

American mathematician

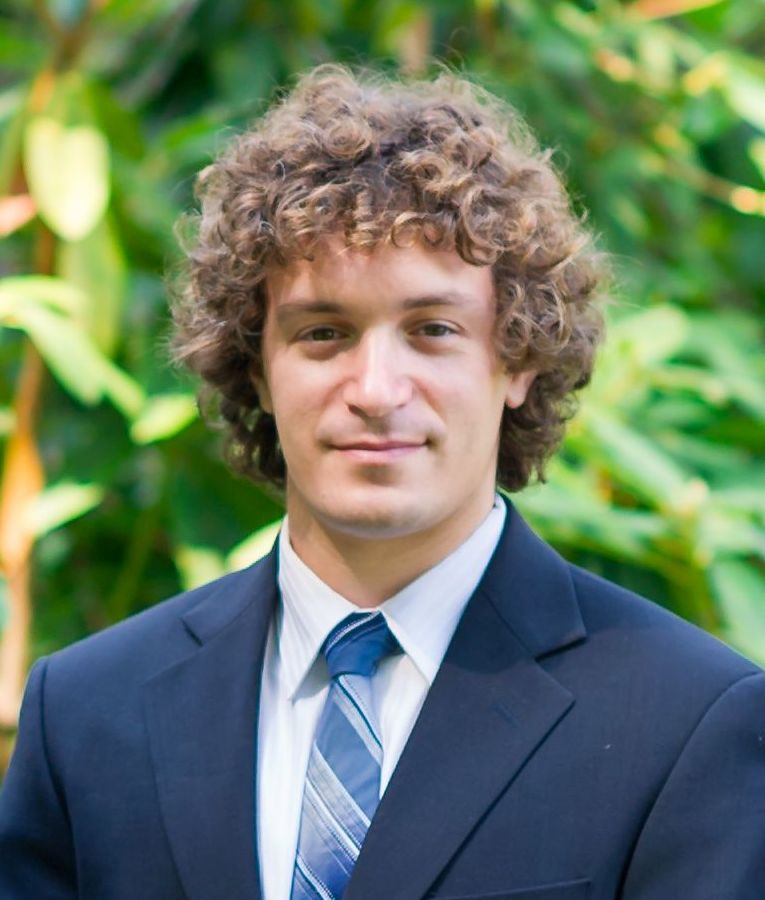
- Born: 1986 (age 39–40); Madison, Wisconsin, US
- Education: Harvard University; MIT
- Awards: Gödel Prize (2026); Sloan Research Fellowship (2017); Morgan Prize (2007); Putnam Fellow (2003–06)
- Scientific career
- Fields: Mathematics; Computer science
- Workplaces: University of California, San Diego
- Doctoral advisor: Barry Mazur
- Other academic advisors: Ken Ono; Erik Demaine; Joseph Gallian; Benedict Gross

Daniel Mertz Kane (born 1986) is an American mathematician. He is a full professor with a joint position in the Mathematics Department and the Computer Science and Engineering Department at the University of California, San Diego.

== Early life and education ==
Kane was born in Madison, Wisconsin, to Janet E. Mertz and Jonathan M. Kane, professors of oncology and of mathematics and computer science, respectively.

He attended Wingra School, a small alternative K-8 school in Madison that focuses on self-guided education. By 3rd grade, he had mastered K through 9th-grade mathematics. Starting at age 13, he took honors math courses at the University of Wisconsin–Madison and did research under the mentorship of Ken Ono while dual enrolled at Madison West High School. He earned gold medals in the 2002 and 2003 International Mathematical Olympiads. Prior to his 17th birthday, he resolved an open conjecture proposed years earlier by Andrews and Lewis; for this research, he was named Fellow Laureate of the Davidson Institute for Talent Development.

He graduated Phi Beta Kappa from the Massachusetts Institute of Technology in 2007 with two bachelor's degrees, one in mathematics with computer science and the other in physics. While at MIT, Kane was one of four people since 2003 (and one of nine in the history of the competition) to be named a four-time Putnam Fellow in the William Lowell Putnam Mathematical Competition. He also won the 2007 Morgan Prize and competed as part of the MIT team in the Mathematical Contest in Modeling four times, earning the highest score three times and winning the Ben Fusaro Award in 2004, INFORMS Award in 2006, and SIAM Award in 2007. He also won the Machtey Award as an undergraduate in 2005, with Tim Abbott and Paul Valiant, for the best student-authored paper at the Symposium on Foundations of Computer Science that year, on the complexity of two-player win-loss games.

Kane received his doctorate in mathematics from Harvard University in 2011; his dissertation, on number theory, was supervised by Barry Mazur. In his curriculum vitae, Kane lists as mentors Ken Ono while in high school; Erik Demaine, Joseph Gallian, and Cesar Silva while an undergraduate student at MIT; and Barry Mazur, Benedict Gross, and Henry Cohn while a graduate student at Harvard.

== Research contributions ==
In 2010, joint work with Jelani Nelson and David Woodruff won both the IBM Pat Goldberg Memorial and Symposium on Principles of Database Systems (PODS) best paper awards for work on an optimal algorithm for the count-distinct problem.

The bulk of his modern research consists of computational statistics, with a focus in robust statistics.
