= Symposium on Discrete Algorithms =

The Annual ACM-SIAM Symposium on Discrete Algorithms (SODA) is an academic conference in the fields of algorithm design and discrete mathematics. It is considered to be one of the top conferences for research in algorithms. SODA has been organized annually since 1990, typically in January. SODA is jointly sponsored by the ACM Special Interest Group on Algorithms and Computation Theory (SIGACT) and the SIAM Activity Group on Discrete Mathematics, and in format is more similar to a theoretical computer science conference than to a mathematics conference.

== History ==
The first Symposium on Discrete Algorithms was held in 1990 at San Francisco, organized by David Johnson. In 2012, the ACM Special Interest Group on Algorithms and Computation Theory (ACM SIGACT) and SIAM Activity Group on Discrete Mathematics (SIAG/DM) jointly established SODA Steering Committee to work with SIAM and ACM on organizing SODA.

Year	PC Chair	Location
1990	David S. Johnson	San Francisco
1991	Alok Aggarwal	San Francisco
1992	Greg N. Frederickson	Orlando
1993	Vijaya Ramachandran	Austin
1994	Daniel Dominic Sleator	Arlington
1995	Kenneth L. Clarkson	San Francisco
1996	Éva Tardos	Atlanta
1997	Michael E. Saks	New Orleans
1998	Howard J. Karloff	San Francisco
1999	Robert Endre Tarjan	Baltimore
2000	David B. Shmoys	San Francisco
2001	S. Rao Kosaraju	Washington, DC,
2002	David Eppstein	San Francisco
2003	Martin Farach-Colton	Baltimore
2004	J. Ian Munro	New Orleans
2005	Adam Buchsbaum	British Columbia
2006	Cliff Stein	Miami
2007	Harold N. Gabow	New Orleans
2008	Shang-Hua Teng	San Francisco
2009	Claire Mathieu	New York
2010	Moses Charikar	Austin
2011	Dana Randall	San Francisco
2012	Yuval Rabani	Kyoto, Japan
2013	Sanjeev Khanna	New Orleans
2014	Chandra Chekuri	Portland
2015	Piotr Indyk	San Diego
2016	Robert Krauthgamer	Arlington
2017	Philip N. Klein	Barcelona, Spain
2018	Artur Czumaj	New Orleans
2019	Timothy M. Chan	San Diego
2020	Shuchi Chawla	Salt Lake City
2021	Dániel Marx	Virtual (planned for Alexandria)
2022	Joseph Seffi Naor	Virtual (planned for Alexandria)
2023	Nikhil Bansal	Florence, Italy
2024	David P. Woodruff	Alexandria
2025	Yossi Azar	New Orleans
2026	Kasper Green Larsen; Barna Saha	Vancouver
