= Martin Farach-Colton =

American computer scientist

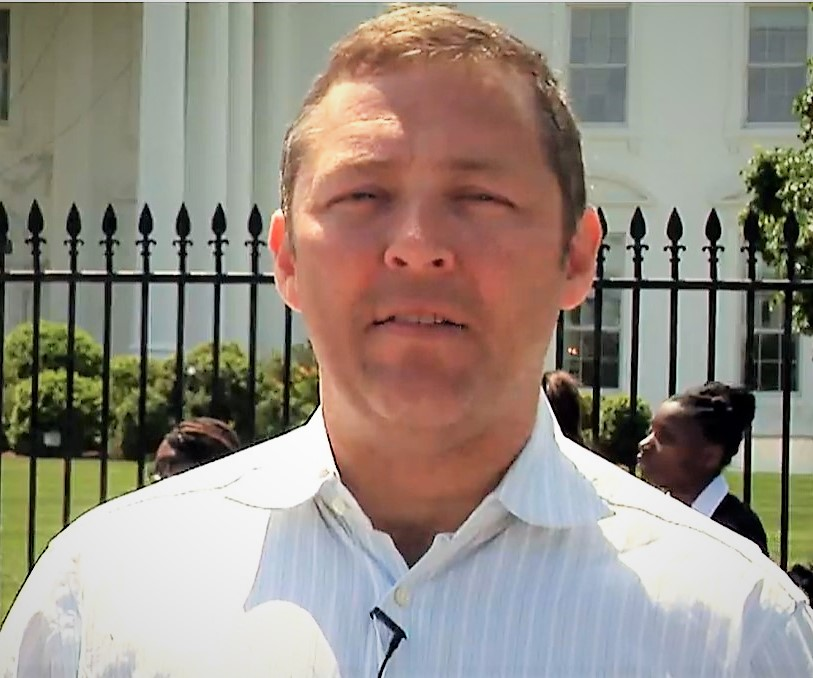
- Farach-Colton at the 2013 White House Office of Science and Technology Policy Big Data Workshop
- Education: Johns Hopkins School of Medicine, MD (1988); University of Maryland, College Park, PhD (1991)
- Scientific career
- Fields: Computer science
- Workplaces: New York University
- Thesis: String Algorithms for Template Matching (1991)
- Doctoral advisor: Amihood Amir

Martin Farach-Colton is an American computer scientist, known for his work in streaming algorithms, suffix tree construction, pattern matching in compressed data, cache-oblivious algorithms, and lowest common ancestor data structures. He is the Leonard J. Shustek Professor of Computer Science and chair of the Department of Computer Science and Engineering at New York University. Formerly, he was a Distinguished Professor of Computer Science at Rutgers University. He co-founded the storage technology startup company Tokutek.

== Early life and education ==
Farach-Colton is of Argentine descent and grew up in South Carolina. While attending medical school, he met his future husband, with whom he now has twin children. He obtained his M.D. in 1988 from the Johns Hopkins School of Medicine and his Ph.D. in computer science in 1991 from the University of Maryland, College Park under the supervision of Amihood Amir.

== Research contributions ==
After completing his Ph.D., he went on to work at Google and co-founded Tokutek. He was program chair of the 14th ACM-SIAM Symposium on Discrete Algorithms (SODA 2003). The cache-oblivious B-tree data structures studied by Bender, Demaine, and Farach-Colton beginning in 2000 became the basis for the fractal tree index used by Tokutek's products TokuDB and TokuMX.

== Awards and honors ==
In 1996, Farach-Colton was awarded an Alfred P. Sloan Research Fellowship. In 2021, he was inducted as a SIAM Fellow "for contributions to the design and analysis of algorithms and their use in storage systems and computational biology" and as an ACM Fellow "for contributions to data structures for biocomputing and big data" In 2022, he was inducted as an IEEE Fellow "for contributions to data structures for storage systems". In 2023, he was elected to the Argentine Academia Nacional de Ciencias Exactas, Fisicas y Naturales. In 2024, he was inducted as an AAAS Fellow.

In 2012, his paper "The LCA problem revisited" won the Simon Imre Test of Time award at LATIN. In 2016, his paper "Optimizing Every Operation in a Write-optimized File System" won the Best Paper award at FAST. In 2023, his paper "Mosaic Pages: Big TLB Reach with Small Pages" won a Distinguished Paper award as ASPLOS.

== Personal life ==
Farach-Colton is an avid Brazilian jiu-jitsu practitioner and received a bronze medal at the 2015 World Master Jiu-Jitsu IBJJF Championship. He received his black belt from Russell Kerr in 2018. Farach-Colton has served on several charity boards including the Ali Forney Center, Lambda Legal, and The Trevor Project. He is the 2025 recipient of the Ali Forney Center Luminary Award.

== Selected publications ==
- Amir, Amihood; Benson, Gary; Farach, Martin (April 1996), "Let sleeping files lie: pattern matching in Z-compressed files" (PDF), Journal of Computer and System Sciences, 52 (2): 299–307, doi:10.1006/jcss.1996.0023, MR 1393996, S2CID 14465635, archived from the original (PDF) on 2017-08-10.
- Farach, Martin (1997), "Optimal suffix tree construction with large alphabets", 38th Annual Symposium on Foundations of Computer Science, FOCS '97, Miami Beach, Florida, USA, October 19-22, 1997, IEEE Computer Society, pp. 137–143, doi:10.1109/SFCS.1997.646102, ISBN 0-8186-8197-7, S2CID 123355749.
- Farach, M.; Thorup, M. (April 1998), "String matching in Lempel-Ziv compressed strings", Algorithmica, 20 (4): 388–404, doi:10.1007/PL00009202, MR 1600834, S2CID 15395909.
- Bender, Michael A.; Farach-Colton, Martin (2000), "The LCA problem revisited" (PDF), in Gonnet, Gaston H.; Panario, Daniel; Viola, Alfredo (eds.), LATIN 2000: Theoretical Informatics, 4th Latin American Symposium, Punta del Este, Uruguay, April 10-14, 2000, Proceedings, Lecture Notes in Computer Science, vol. 1776, Springer, pp. 88–94, doi:10.1007/10719839_9, ISBN 978-3-540-67306-4.
- Charikar, Moses; Chen, Kevin; Farach-Colton, Martin (2004), "Finding frequent items in data streams" (PDF), Theoretical Computer Science, 312 (1): 3–15, doi:10.1016/S0304-3975(03)00400-6, MR 2045483. Previously announced in ICALP 2002.
- Bender, Michael A.; Demaine, Erik D.; Farach-Colton, Martin (2005), "Cache-oblivious B-trees", SIAM Journal on Computing, 35 (2): 341–358, doi:10.1137/S0097539701389956, MR 2191447. Previously announced at FOCS 2000.
