= Mireille Bousquet-Mélou =

French mathematician (born 1967)

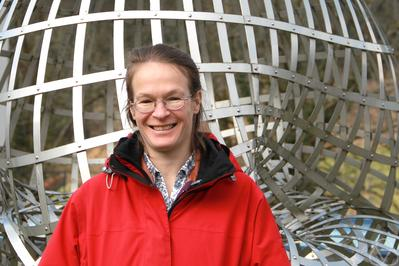
Mireille Bousquet-Mélou at Oberwolfach in 2014.

Mireille Bousquet-Mélou (born 12 May 1967) is a French mathematician who specializes in enumerative combinatorics and who works as a senior researcher for the Centre national de la recherche scientifique (CNRS) at the computer science department (LaBRI) of the University of Bordeaux.

== Education and career ==
Bousquet-Mélou was born in Albi, the second daughter of two high school teachers, and grew up in Pau where her family moved when she was three. She studied at the École Normale Supérieure in Paris from 1986 to 1990, as the only woman in her entering class of mathematicians, and earned an agrégation in mathematics in 1989, with Xavier Gérard Viennot as her mentor in combinatorics. She completed her Ph.D. at the University of Bordeaux in 1991, with a dissertation on the enumeration of orthogonally convex polyominos supervised by Viennot. She joined CNRS as a junior researcher in 1990, and completed a habilitation at Bordeaux in 1996.

== Awards and honors ==
Bousquet-Mélou won the bronze medal of the CNRS in 1993, and the silver medal in 2014. Linköping University gave her an honorary doctorate in 2005, and the French Academy of Sciences gave her their Charles-Louis de Saulces de Freycinet Prize in 2009. In 2006, she was an invited speaker at the International Congress of Mathematicians in the section on combinatorics. Her presentation at the congress concerned connections between enumerative combinatorics, formal language theory, and the algebraic structure of generating functions, according to which enumeration problems whose generating functions are rational functions are often isomorphic to regular languages, and problems whose generating functions are algebraic are often isomorphic to unambiguous context-free languages.

== Selected publications ==
- Bousquet-Mélou, Mireille (1996), "A method for the enumeration of various classes of column-convex polygons", Discrete Mathematics, 154 (1–3): 1–25, doi:10.1016/0012-365X(95)00003-F, MR 1395445.
- Bousquet-Mélou, Mireille; Petkovšek, Marko (2000), "Linear recurrences with constant coefficients: the multivariate case", Discrete Mathematics, 225 (1–3): 51–75, doi:10.1016/S0012-365X(00)00147-3, MR 1798324.
- Banderier, Cyril; Bousquet-Mélou, Mireille; Denise, Alain; Flajolet, Philippe; Gardy, Danièle; Gouyou-Beauchamps, Dominique (2002), "Generating functions for generating trees", Discrete Mathematics, 246 (1–3): 29–55, arXiv:math/0411250, doi:10.1016/S0012-365X(01)00250-3, MR 1884885, S2CID 14804110.
- Bousquet-Mélou, Mireille (2006), "Rational and algebraic series in combinatorial enumeration", International Congress of Mathematicians. Vol. III, Eur. Math. Soc., Zürich, pp. 789–826, MR 2275707.
