= Natasha Devroye =

Belgian and Canadian information theorist

Natasha Devroye is a Belgian and Canadian information theorist known for her research on the channel capacity of cognitive radio communications. She is a professor of electrical and computer engineering at the University of Illinois Chicago.

== Education and career ==
Devroye grew up in Montreal. Attracted to both mathematics and electrical engineering in high school, she chose to study engineering because of its higher admission standards at McGill University, where she graduated in 2002. At McGill, she specialized in communications, with a bachelor's thesis supervised by Fabrice Labeau. She went to Harvard University for graduate study in engineering, completing her Ph.D. in 2007 with the dissertation Information Theoretic Limits of Cognition and Cooperation in Wireless Networks supervised by Vahid Tarokh.

After another year of postdoctoral research at Harvard, she joined the University of Illinois Chicago as an assistant professor in 2009. She was promoted to associate professor in 2015 and full professor in 2020.

== Recognition ==
Devroye was elected as an IEEE Fellow, in the 2023 class of fellows, "for fundamental contributions to the theoretical understanding of cognitive, two-way, and relay networks".

== Personal life ==
Devroye is the daughter of Montreal-based Belgian computer scientist and mathematician Luc Devroye. Her husband, Jakob Eriksson, is a computer scientist at the University of Illinois Chicago.
