= Janet E. Mertz =

American biochemist

- Born: 1949 (age 76–77); The Bronx, New York
- Education: MIT; Stanford University
- Known for: Recombinant DNA; Gender and Math
- Children: Daniel Kane
- Scientific career
- Fields: Oncology; Virology; Biochemistry
- Workplaces: University of Wisconsin–Madison
- Doctoral advisor: Paul Berg
- Other academic advisors: John B. Gurdon; Harvey Lodish
- Doctoral students: Alice Barkan

Janet E. Mertz (born 1949) is an American biochemist, molecular biologist, and cancer researcher. She is currently the Elizabeth McCoy Professor of Oncology in the McArdle Laboratory for Cancer Research at the University of Wisconsin–Madison. Mertz is best known for disputing Lawrence Summers' 2005 suggestion that women lack the intrinsic aptitude to excel in mathematics at the highest level and for discovering an easy method for joining DNAs from different species. This latter finding initiated the era of genetic engineering whose ramifications form the basis of modern genetics and the biotechnology industry.

After completing bachelor's degrees in biology and electrical engineering at the Massachusetts Institute of Technology, Mertz attended graduate school at Stanford University from 1970 to 1975, earning a Ph.D. in Biochemistry. Also in the year 1970, Mertz joined Paul Berg's lab which was located in the biochemistry department at Stanford. Berg said that Mertz was "as smart as all hell." While taking a course held at the Cold Spring Harbor Laboratory in summer 1971, she mentioned her plan to grow mutants of the oncovirus, SV40, by molecular cloning of them in the human gut bacterium, E. coli. This event led, initially, to a voluntary moratorium on cloning of viral oncogenes and, later on, the cloning of any DNA that might contain potentially biohazardous materials until theoretical safety concerns could be addressed and guidelines for their safe use could be developed and implemented.

In the interim, in collaboration with Ronald W. Davis, Mertz discovered that DNA ends generated by cutting with the EcoRI restriction enzyme are "sticky", permitting any two such DNAs to be readily "recombined". Using this discovery, in June 1972 she created the first recombinant DNA that could have been cloned in bacteria. Her success with this project contributed to her thesis adviser, Paul Berg, receiving the 1980 Nobel Prize in Chemistry. However, Mertz did not proceed with this cloning because of the moratorium in place at that time, leaving it for Herbert Boyer, Stanley N. Cohen and their colleagues to prove in 1973 that recombinant DNAs made by this method can actually self-replicate in bacteria. Thus, most of Mertz's Ph.D. thesis centered, instead, around developing other ways to create, select, and grow mutants of SV40 for studying this virus' functions and so it could be used as the first eukaryotic cloning vector. The US Patent 4,237,224, "Process for Producing Biologically Functional Molecular Chimeras", which generated over $250 million in licensing and royalty income, listed only Boyer and Cohen as co-inventors. Some have questioned whether these patents were valid given the earlier publications by Peter Lobban and A. Dale Kaiser and the Berg laboratory that were already in the public domain at the time this application was filed in November 1974.

== Later research and academic career ==
Mertz spent 15 months as a postdoctoral researcher at the Medical Research Council. In collaboration with John B. Gurdon and Edward M. De Robertis, she showed that biological macromolecules injected into frog oocytes are properly used, providing the first way to study many aspects of gene expression in a higher eukaryote.

Mertz has been a member of the University of Wisconsin - Madison faculty since 1976. Her laboratory studies regulation of expression of the genes of the DNA oncoviruses SV40, hepatitis B virus, and Epstein–Barr virus and the roles the nuclear receptor estrogen-related receptor α plays in breast cancer and regulating the activities of estrogen receptor α.
