= Jelani Nelson =

American computer scientist (born 1984)

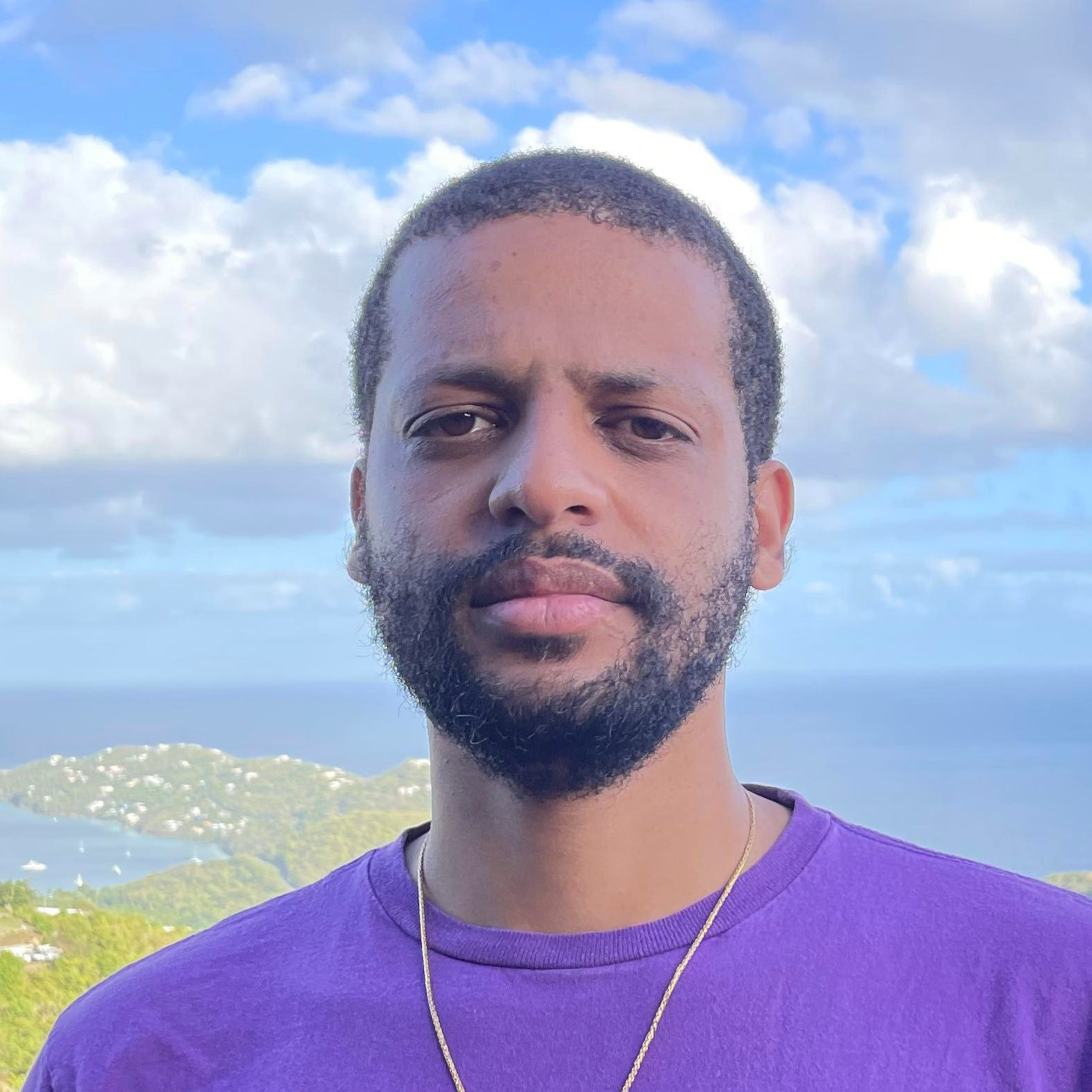
- Nelson in 2021
- Born: June 28, 1984 (age 42); Los Angeles, California, U.S.
- Education: Massachusetts Institute of Technology (BS, MEng, PhD)
- Awards: ACM Eugene L. Lawler Award (2022); Presidential Early Career Award for Scientists and Engineers (2017); Sloan Fellowship (2017)
- Scientific career
- Fields: Algorithms; Computational complexity theory
- Workplaces: Harvard University; University of California, Berkeley
- Thesis: Sketching and Streaming High-Dimensional Vectors
- Doctoral advisor: Erik Demaine and Piotr Indyk
- Website: people.eecs.berkeley.edu/~minilek/

Jelani Osei Nelson (Amharic: ጄላኒ ኔልሰን; born June 28, 1984) is an American Professor of Electrical Engineering and Computer Sciences at the University of California, Berkeley who is currently on leave to work at Anthropic. He won the 2014 Presidential Early Career Award for Scientists and Engineers. Nelson is the creator of AddisCoder, a computer science summer program for Ethiopian high school students in Addis Ababa.

== Early life and education ==
Nelson was born to an Ethiopian mother and an African-American father in Los Angeles, then grew up in St. Thomas, U.S. Virgin Islands. He studied mathematics and computer science at the Massachusetts Institute of Technology and remained there to complete his doctoral studies in computer science. His Master's dissertation, External-Memory Search Trees with Fast Insertions, was supervised by Bradley C. Kuszmaul and Charles E. Leiserson. He was a member of the theory of computation group, working on efficient algorithms for massive datasets. His doctoral dissertation, Sketching and Streaming High-Dimensional Vectors (2011), was supervised by Erik Demaine and Piotr Indyk.

After his doctorate, Nelson worked as a postdoctoral scholar at the Mathematical Sciences Research Institute in Berkeley, California, then Princeton University and the Institute for Advanced Study. He specialises in sketching and streaming algorithms.

== Career ==
Nelson is interested in big data and the development of efficient algorithms. He joined the computer science faculty at Harvard University in 2013 and remained there until joining UC Berkeley in 2019. He is known for his contributions to streaming algorithms and dimensionality reduction, including proving that the Johnson–Lindenstrauss lemma is optimal (with Kasper Green Larsen), developing the Sparse Johnson-Lindenstrauss Transform (with Daniel Kane), and an asymptotically optimal algorithm for the count-distinct problem (with Daniel Kane and David P. Woodruff). He holds two patents related to applications of streaming algorithms to network traffic monitoring applications. Nelson was the recipient of an Office of Naval Research Young Investigator Award in 2015 and a Director of Research Early Career Award in 2016. He was awarded an Alfred P. Sloan Foundation Fellowship in 2017.

=== Advocacy for rigorous math education ===
Nelson opposes the proposed California Mathematics Framework, expressing concern that the modified curriculum will harm vulnerable students by denying them rigorous mathematical instruction. In an interview with The New Yorker, he stated: “I’m extremely worried that the C.M.F. is implicitly advocating for certain groups of people to be pushed away from rigorous math courses into essentially a lower track, setting back progress in improving diversity in STEM.” Nelson clashed with Jo Boaler, a co-author of the C.M.F drafts and an advocate for equity-based math instruction in California. Nelson co-wrote an open letter objecting to the C.M.F, and critiqued Boaler in his interview with the New Yorker. After resharing a tweet critiquing Boaler's consultancy fees in April 2022, Boaler threatened police involvement, with the accusation that the shared tweet was spreading personal information. Later, the tweet was deleted and Nelson stated the threat of police involvement was an "intimidation tactic". In practice, no police involvement came to action, against Nelson or otherwise.

=== AddisCoder and JamCoders ===
Nelson founded AddisCoder, a summer program teaching computer science and algorithms to high schoolers in Ethiopia, in 2011 while finishing his PhD at Massachusetts Institute of Technology,. The program has trained over 500 alumni, some of whom have gone on to study at Harvard, MIT, Columbia, Stanford, Cornell, Princeton, KAIST, and Seoul National University, and to pursue PhDs in science and mathematics. Starting in 2022, Nelson also co-organized JamCoders, a summer algorithms and coding camp in Jamaica modeled on AddisCoder.

=== David Harold Blackwell Summer Research Institute ===
Nelson co-founded the David Harold Blackwell Summer Research Institute, which aims to increase the number of African-American students receiving PhDs in mathematics.

== Awards and honours ==
- 2022 ACM Eugene L. Lawler Award
- 2017 Presidential Early Career Award for Scientists and Engineers
- 2017 Alfred P. Sloan Research Fellowship
- 2011 George M. Sprowls Award for Outstanding Doctoral Thesis
- 2010 IBM Research Pat Goldberg Memorial Best Paper Award
