= Brigitte Vallée =

French mathematician (born 1950)

- Born: Brigitte Marie Suzanne Salesse; 6 June 1950 (age 76); Courbevoie, Hauts-de-Seine, France
- Education: University of Caen
- Occupations: mathematician, computer scientist

Brigitte Vallée (née Salesse) (born 6 June 1950, in Courbevoie, Hauts-de-Seine, France) is a French mathematician and computer scientist. She entered the École Normale Supérieure de Jeunes Filles in 1970, and received her PhD in 1986 at the University of Caen (Lattice reduction algorithms in small dimensions). Her doctoral advisor was Jacques Stern.

Vallée has been Director of Research at the French CNRS at Université de Caen, since 2001 and specialized in computational number theory and analysis of algorithms. Amongst the algorithms she studied are the celebrated LLL algorithm used for basis reductions in Euclidean lattice and the different Euclidean algorithms to determine GCD. The main tool used to achieve her results is the so-called dynamical analysis. Loosely speaking, it is a mix between analysis of algorithms and dynamical systems. Brigitte Vallée greatly contributed to the development of this method.

In the early 90s, Brigitte Vallée's work on small modular squares allowed her to hold the fastest factorisation algorithm with a proved probabilistic complexity bound. Nowadays, other factorisation algorithms are faster.

She was appointed a knight of the Legion of Honor by the Ministry of Higher Education and Research on 12 July 2013.

== Selected publications ==
According to zbMath, Vallée has authored 88 publications since 1986, including 3 books.

- Brigitte Vallée, Generation of Elements with Small Modular Squares and Provably Fast Integer Factoring Algorithms, Mathematics of Computation, Vol. 56, No. 194 (Apr., 1991), pp. 823–849.
- Brigitte Vallée, Algorithmique en géométrie des nombres. Applications à la cryptographie et à la factorisation des entiers (A geometric approach to the reduction of small-scale networks), 1986 [University thesis]
