= Claire Mathieu =

French computer scientist

Claire Mathieu (formerly Kenyon, born 1965) is a French computer scientist and mathematician, known for her research on approximation algorithms, online algorithms, and auction theory. She works as a director of research at the Centre national de la recherche scientifique.

Mathieu earned her Ph.D. in 1988 from the University of Paris-Sud, under the supervision of Claude Puech. She worked at CNRS and ENS Lyon from 1991 to 1997, at Paris-Sud from 1997 to 2002, at the École Polytechnique from 2002 to 2004, and at Brown University from 2004 to 2011 before returning to CNRS in 2012.

She was an invited speaker at the 2014 International Colloquium on Automata, Languages and Programming and at the 2015 Symposium on Discrete Algorithms. She won the CNRS Silver Medal in 2019. In 2020, she became a Chevalier of the Légion d'honneur.

== Biography ==
Claire Mathieu was born on March 9, 1965. She attended Marcel Pagnol Middle School in Caen from 1974 to 1977—now known as Stephen Hawking Middle School—and then François Couperin High School in Fontainebleau from 1977 to 1981, where she earned her baccalaureate. After two years of preparatory classes for the grandes écoles (CPGE) at the Lycée Louis-le-Grand in Paris, she enrolled at the École normale supérieure de jeunes filles (ENS Sèvres) in 1983. She earned a master’s degree in mathematics from Paris-Diderot University (Paris-VII) in 1984. Intending to pursue a career in mathematical research, she was then required to take a computer science course. She attended it reluctantly, but ultimately enjoyed it so much that she decided to continue her studies in this field. She earned a Diploma of Advanced Studies (DEA) in computer science in 1985 from Paris-Sud University(Paris-XI), followed by a Ph.D. in computer science in 1988 from the same university under the supervision of Claude Puech.
