= CRM domain =

CRS1_YhbY
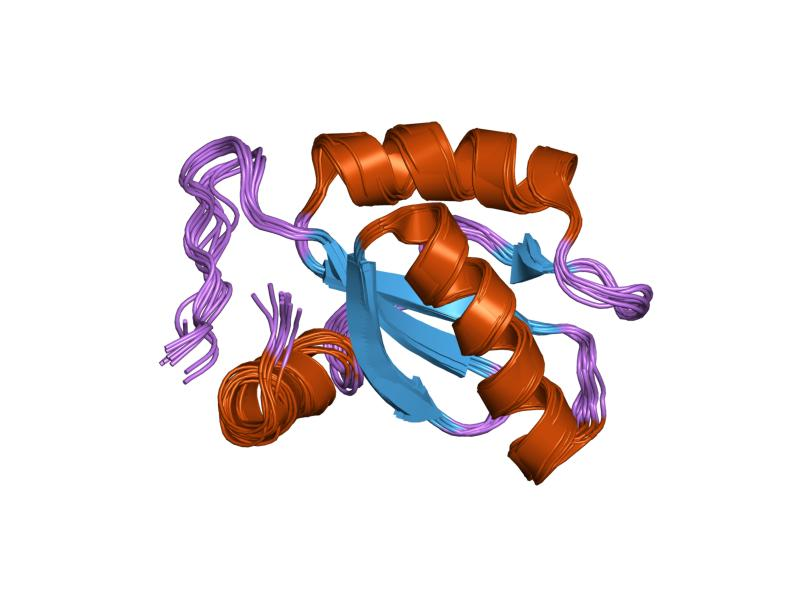
- solution structure of the hypothetical protein sav1595 from staphylococcus aureus, a putative rna binding protein

Identifiers
- Symbol: CRS1_YhbY
- Pfam: PF01985
- InterPro: IPR001890
- PROSITE: PDOC01005
- SCOP2: 1jo0 / SCOPe / SUPFAM
Available protein structures:
- Pfam: structures / ECOD
- PDB: RCSB PDB; PDBe; PDBj
- PDBsum: structure summary

In molecular biology, the CRM domain is an approximately 100-amino acid RNA-binding domain. The name CRM (chloroplast RNA splicing and ribosome maturation) has been suggested to reflect the functions established for four characterised members of the family: Zea mays (Maize) CRS1, CAF1 and CAF2 proteins and the Escherichia coli protein YhbY. Proteins containing the CRM domain are found in eubacteria, archaea, and plants. The CRM domain is represented as a stand-alone protein in archaea and bacteria, and in single- and multi-domain proteins in plants. It has been suggested that prokaryotic CRM proteins existed as ribosome-associated proteins prior to the divergence of archaea and bacteria, and that they were co-opted in the plant lineage as RNA binding modules by incorporation into diverse protein contexts. Plant CRM domains are predicted to reside not only in the chloroplast, but also in the mitochondrion and the nucleo/cytoplasmic compartment. The diversity of the CRM domain family in plants suggests a diverse set of RNA targets.

The CRM domain is a compact alpha/beta domain consisting of a four-stranded beta sheet and three alpha helices with an alpha-beta-alpha-beta-alpha-beta-beta topology. The beta sheet face is basic, consistent with a role in RNA binding. Proximal to the basic beta sheet face is another moiety that could contribute to nucleic acid recognition. Connecting strand beta1 and helix alpha2 is a loop with a six amino acid motif, GxxG flanked by large aliphatic residues, within which one 'x' is typically a basic residue.

Escherichia coli YhbY is associated with pre-50S ribosomal subunits, which implies a function in ribosome assembly. GFP fused to a single-domain CRM protein from maize localises to the nucleolus, suggesting that an analogous activity may have been retained in plants. A CRM domain containing protein in plant chloroplasts has been shown to function in group I and II intron splicing. In vitro experiments with an isolated maize CRM domain have shown it to have RNA binding activity. These and other results suggest that the CRM domain evolved in the context of ribosome function prior to the divergence of Archaea and Bacteria, that this function has been maintained in extant prokaryotes, and that the domain was recruited to serve as an RNA binding module during the evolution of plant genomes. YhbY has a fold similar to that of the C-terminal domain of translation initiation factor 3 (IF3C), which binds to 16S rRNA in the 30S ribosome.
