= Svante Janson =

Swedish mathematician

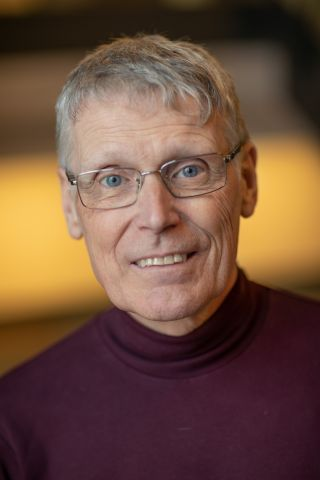
- Svante Janson
- Born: 21 May 1955 (age 71)
- Citizenship: Swedish
- Education: Uppsala University
- Known for: Janson's inequality (probability); Random graphs (Hoeffding decomposition & U-statistics) "Birth of the giant component" (with coauthors)
- Awards: Royal Swedish Academy of Sciences (KVA); 1978 Sparre Award (KVA); Royal Scientific Society of Uppsala; 1994 Göran Gustafsson prize 2009 Gårding prize (Royal Physiological Society, Lund)
- Scientific career
- Fields: Mathematical analysis Mathematical statistics
- Workplaces: Uppsala University (1980–1984, 1985–present); Mittag-Leffler Institute (1978–1980); University of Chicago (1980–1981); Stockholm University (1984–1985)
- Doctoral advisor: Lennart Carleson (mathematics, 1977); Carl-Gustav Esseen (mathematical statistics, 1984)

Carl Svante Janson (born 21 May 1955) is a Swedish mathematician. A member of the Royal Swedish Academy of Sciences since 1994, Janson has been the chaired professor of mathematics at Uppsala University since 1987.

In mathematical analysis, Janson has publications in functional analysis (especially harmonic analysis) and probability theory. In mathematical statistics, Janson has made contributions to the theory of U-statistics. In combinatorics, Janson has publications in probabilistic combinatorics, particularly random graphs and in the analysis of algorithms: In the study of random graphs, Janson introduced U-statistics and the Hoeffding decomposition.

== Biography ==
Svante Janson has already had a long career in mathematics, because he started research at a very young age.

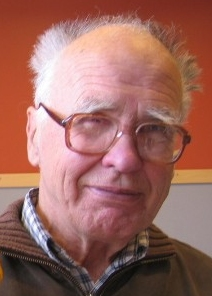
Lennart Carleson was the doctoral supervisor of Svante Janson, who received his Ph.D. on his 22nd birthday. Carleson had himself received his Ph.D. when he was 22 years old.

=== From prodigy to docent ===
A child prodigy in mathematics, Janson took high-school and even university classes while in primary school. He was admitted in 1968 to University of Gothenburg at age 12. After his 1968 matriculation at Uppsala University at age 13, Janson obtained the following degrees in mathematics: a "candidate of philosophy" (roughly an "honours" B.S. with a thesis) at age 14 (in 1970) and a doctor of philosophy at age 21–22 (in 1977). Janson's Ph.D. was awarded on his 22nd birthday. Janson's doctoral dissertation was supervised by Lennart Carleson, who had himself received his doctoral degree when he was 22 years old.

After having earned his doctorate, Janson was a postdoc with the Mittag-Leffler Institute from 1978 to 1980. Thereafter he worked at Uppsala University. Janson's ongoing research earned him another PhD from Uppsala University in 1984 – this second doctoral degree being in mathematical statistics; the supervisor was Carl-Gustav Esseen.

In 1984, Janson was hired by Stockholm University as docent (roughly associate professor in the USA).

=== Professorships ===
In 1985 Janson returned to Uppsala University, where he was named the chaired professor in mathematical statistics. In 1987 Janson became the chaired professor of mathematics at Uppsala university. Traditionally in Sweden, the chaired professor has had the role of a "professor ordinarius" in a German university (roughly combining the roles of research professor and director of graduate studies at a research university in the USA).

== Awards ==
Besides being a member of the Royal Swedish Academy of Sciences (KVA), Svante Janson is a member of the Royal Society of Sciences in Uppsala. His thesis received the 1978 Sparre Award from the KVA. He received the 1994 Swedish medal for the best young mathematical scientist, the Göran Gustafsson Prize. Janson's former doctoral student, Ola Hössjer, received the Göran Gustafsson prize in 2009, becoming the first statistician so honored.

In December 2009, Janson received the Eva & Lars Gårding prize from the Royal Physiographic Society in Lund. In 2021, Janson received the Flajolet Lecture Prize. He delivered the fifth Flajolet Lecture at the 2022 AofA conference.

== Works by Janson ==
=== Books ===
- Barbour, A. D.; Holst, Lars; Janson, Svante (1992). Poisson Approximation. Oxford, UK: Oxford University Press. ISBN 0-19-852235-5. MR 1163825.
- Janson, Svante (1994). "Orthogonal decompositions and functional limit theorems for random graph statistics". Memoirs of the American Mathematical Society. 111 (534). Providence, Rhode Island: American Mathematical Society: vi+78. doi:10.1090/memo/0534. ISBN 0-8218-2595-X. MR 1219708.
- Janson, Svante (1997). Gaussian Hilbert spaces. Cambridge Tracts in Mathematics. Vol. 129. Cambridge: Cambridge University Press. pp. x, 340. ISBN 0-521-56128-0. MR 1474726.
- Janson, Svante; Łuczak, Tomasz; Rucinski, Andrzej (2000). Random graphs. Wiley-Interscience Series in Discrete Mathematics and Optimization. New York: Wiley-Interscience. pp. xii+333. ISBN 0-471-17541-2. MR 1782847.

=== Selected articles ===
- Janson, Svante (1990). "Poisson approximation for large deviations". Random Structures and Algorithms. 1 (2): 221–229. doi:10.1002/rsa.3240010209. MR 1138428. (Janson's inequality)
- Janson, Svante; Knuth, Donald E.; Luczak, Tomasz; Pittel, Boris (1993). "The birth of the giant component". Random Structures and Algorithms. 4 (3): 231–358. arXiv:math/9310236. doi:10.1002/rsa.3240040303. MR 1220220. S2CID 206454812.
- Janson, Svante; Nowicki, Krzysztof (1991). "The asymptotic distributions of generalized U-statistics with applications to random graphs". Probability Theory and Related Fields. 90 (3): 341–375. doi:10.1007/BF01193750. MR 1133371. S2CID 120249197.
