= Luc Devroye =

Belgian mathematician, computer scientist, and professor

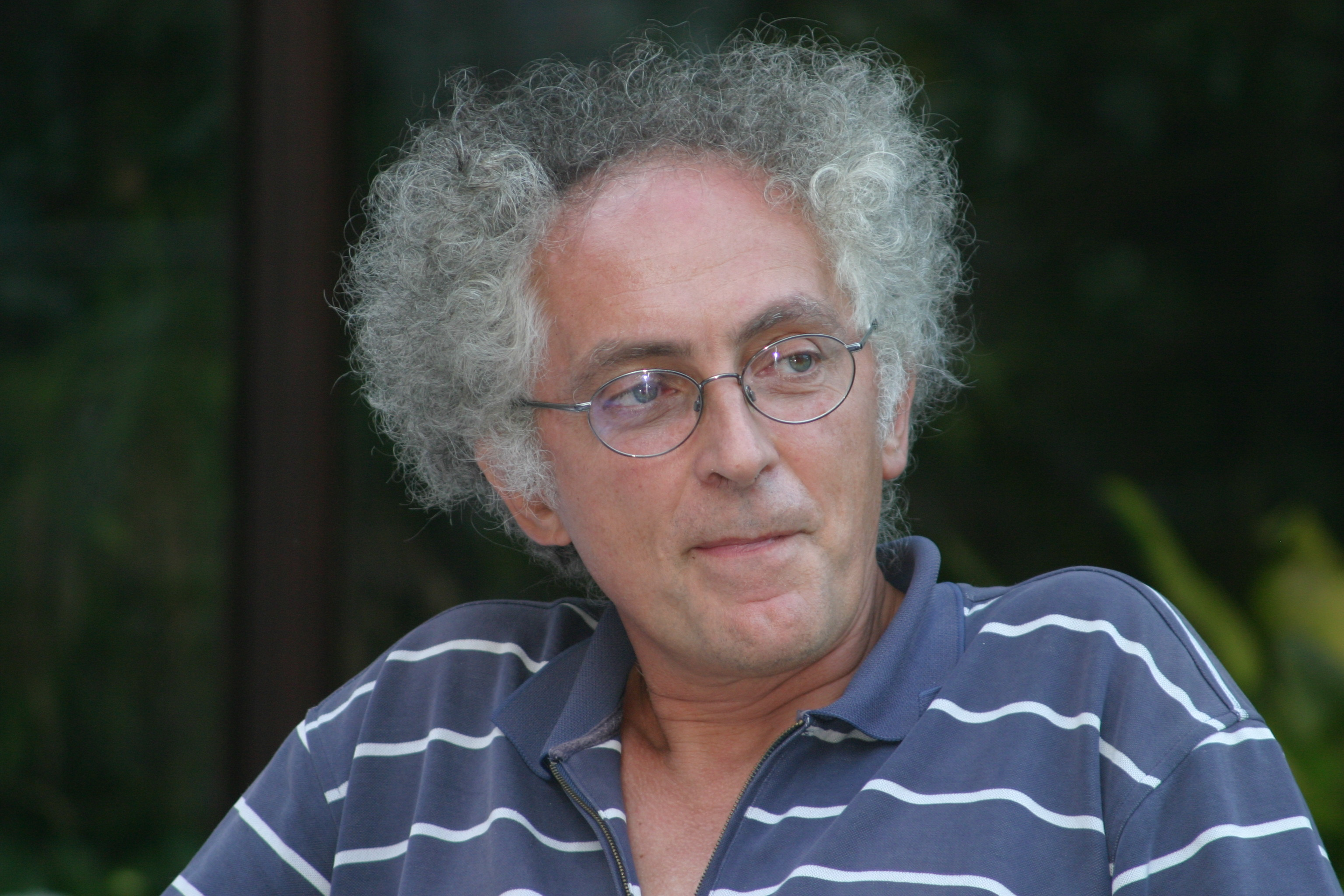
- Children: Natasha Devroye

Luc Devroye is a Belgian computer scientist and mathematician and a James McGill Professor in the School of Computer Science of McGill University in Montreal, Quebec, Canada.

Devroye wrote around 300 mathematical articles, mostly on probabilistic analysis of algorithms, on the asymptotic analysis of combinatorial structures (like trees and graphs), and on random number generation (more precisely, on efficient simulation of different probability distributions).

He also contributed to typography (creating several fonts).

== Education and career ==
He studied at Katholieke Universiteit Leuven and subsequently at Osaka University and in 1976 received his PhD from University of Texas at Austin under the supervision of Terry Wagner, for his thesis titled Nonparametric Discrimination and Density Estimation.

Devroye then joined the McGill University in 1977.

== Awards ==
Devroye won an E.W.R. Steacie Memorial Fellowship (1987), a Humboldt Research Award (2004), the Killam Prize (2005) and the Statistical Society of Canada gold medal (2008). He received an honorary doctorate from the University of Louvain (UCLouvain) in 2002, and he received an honorary doctorate from University of Antwerp in 2012. In 2018, he was awarded the Flajolet Lecture Prize, and, in 2019, he got the Laplace Prize of the French Statistical Society.
