= Wojciech Szpankowski =

Polish computer scientist

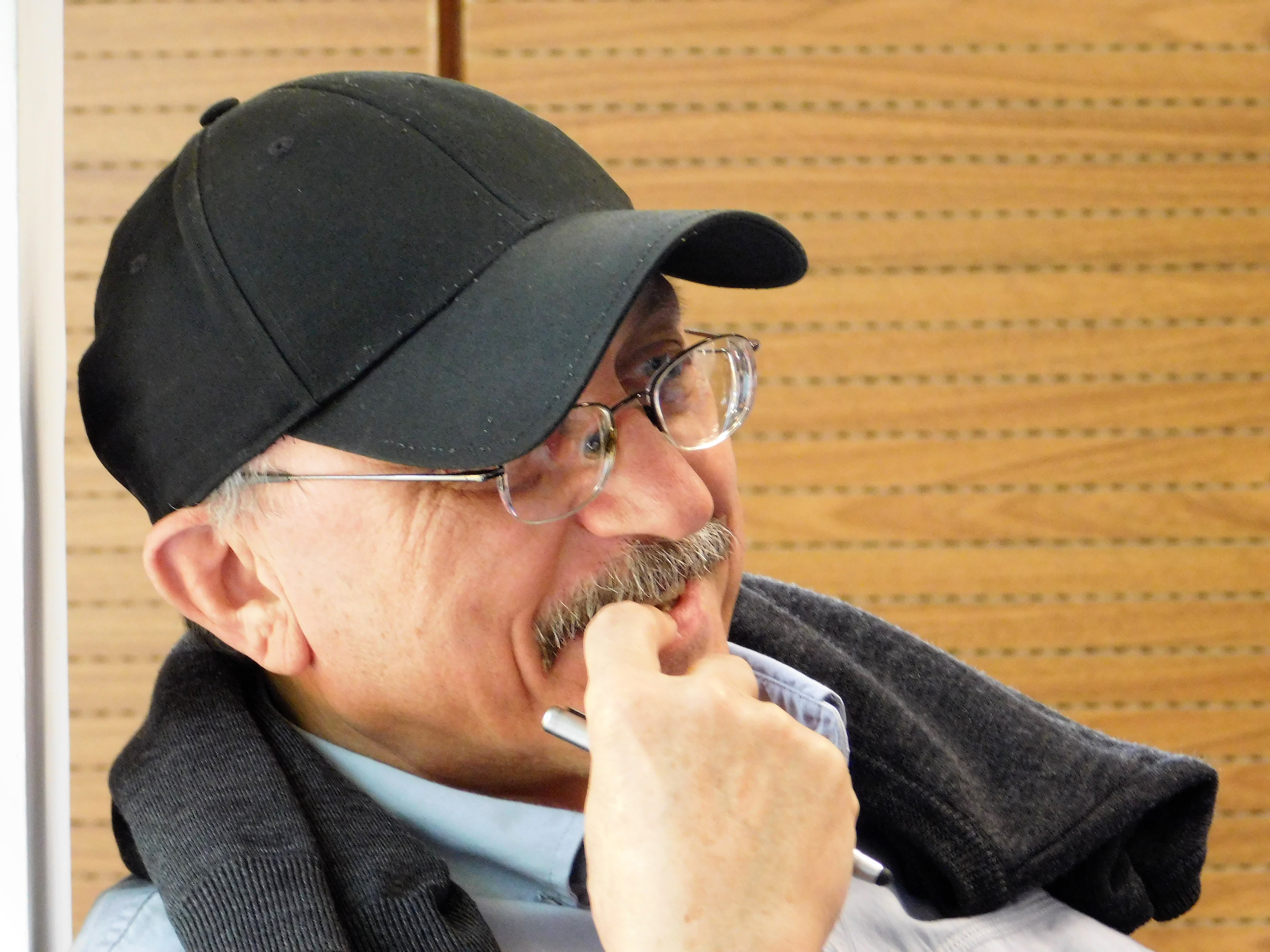
- Wojciech Szpankowski in 2017
- Born: February 18, 1952 (age 74); Wapno, Poland
- Education: Technical University of Gdańsk
- Awards: Humboldt Research Award; Arden L. Bement Jr. Award; Flajolet Lecture Prize
- Scientific career
- Fields: Information Theory; Analysis of algorithms
- Workplaces: Purdue University
- Website: www.cs.purdue.edu/homes/spa/

Wojciech Szpankowski (born February 18, 1952, in Wapno) is the Saul Rosen Professor of Computer Science at Purdue University. He is known for his work in analytic combinatorics, analysis of algorithms and analytic information theory. He is the director of the NSF Science and Technology Center for Science of Information.

== Biography ==
Szpankowski received his MS and PhD in Electrical Engineering and Computer Science from the Technical University of Gdańsk in 1970 and 1980 respectively.

== Awards and honors ==
- Fellow of IEEE
- The Erskine Fellow
- Flajolet Lecture Prize
- Humboldt Research Award
