= Mihyun Kang =

Korean mathematician

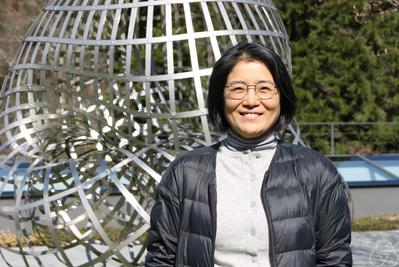
- Kang in Oberwolfach, 2023
- Education: KAIST
- Awards: Friedrich Wilhelm Bessel Research Prize (2019)
- Scientific career
- Fields: Mathematics
- Workplaces: Graz University of Technology; LMU Munich; HU Berlin
- Thesis: Random Walks on a Union of Finite Groups (2001)
- Doctoral advisor: Geon Ho Choe

Mihyun Kang (Korean: 강미현) is a South Korean mathematician specializing in combinatorics, including graph enumeration and the topological properties of random graphs. She is a professor in the Institute of Discrete Mathematics at the Graz University of Technology.

== Education and career ==
Kang completed a PhD at KAIST, the Korea Advanced Institute of Science and Technology, in 2001. Her dissertation, Random Walks on a Union of Finite Groups, was supervised by Geon Ho Choe.

She became a postdoctoral researcher at the Humboldt University of Berlin from 2001 to 2008, and completed a habilitation there in 2007. From 2008 to 2011, she was funded by the German Research Foundation as a Heisenberg Fellow. After taking an acting professorship at LMU Munich in 2011, she became a full professor at the Graz University of Technology in 2012. At the same time, she became head of the Institute of Discrete Mathematics at Graz.

== Recognition ==
Kang was a 2019 winner of the Friedrich Wilhelm Bessel Research Prize of the Alexander von Humboldt Foundation.
