= Philippe Flajolet =

French computer scientist (1948–2011)

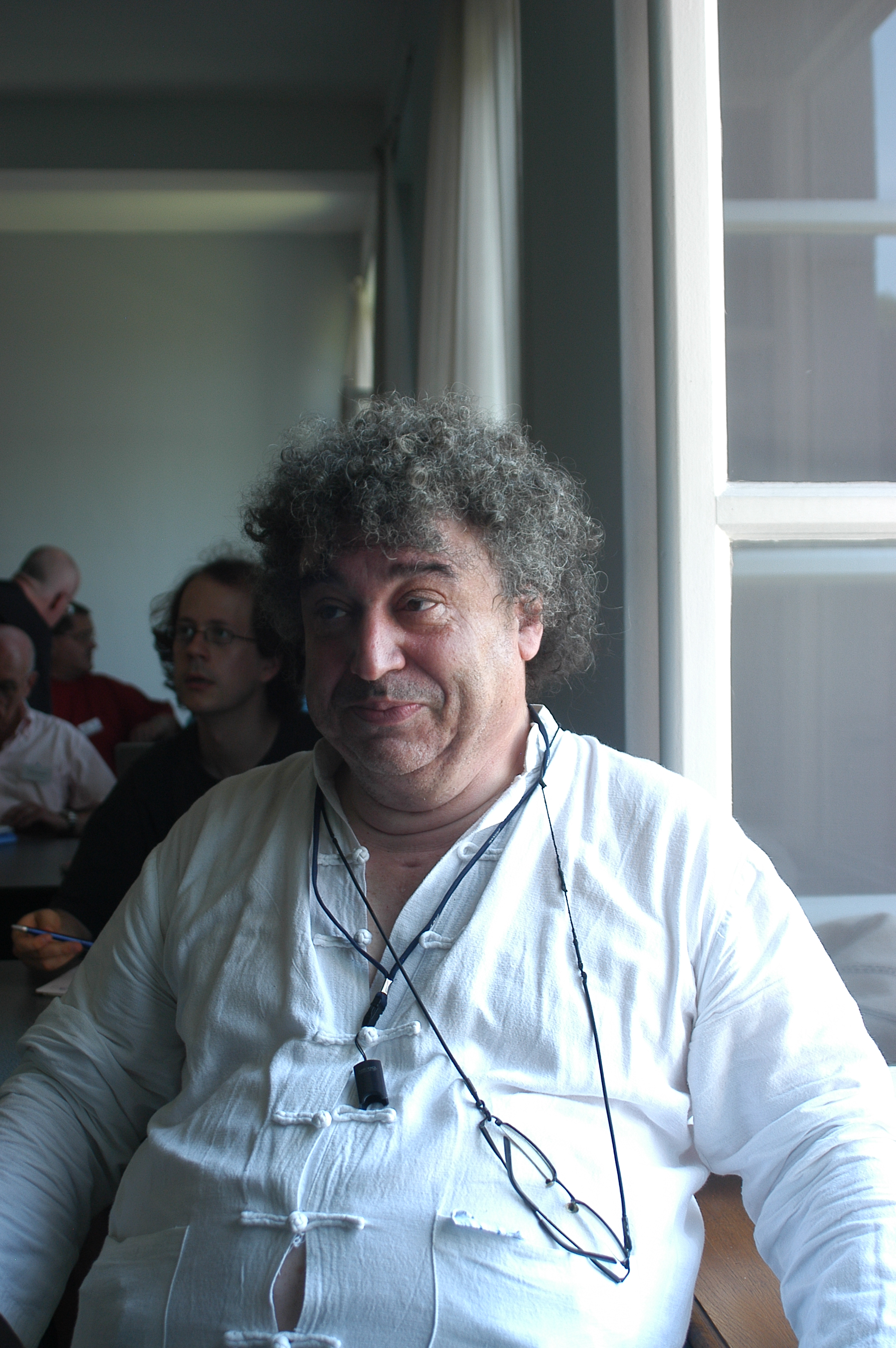
- Philippe Flajolet, in 2006, at the Analysis of Algorithms international conference
- Born: 1 December 1948; Lyon
- Died: 22 March 2011 (aged 62); Paris
- Education: Paris-Sud 11 University; University Paris Diderot
- Awards: Knight of the Légion d'honneur CNRS Silver Medal; Doctor honoris causa from Université libre de Bruxelles
- Scientific career
- Fields: Mathematics, Computer Science
- Workplaces: INRIA; University of Paris
- Doctoral advisor: Maurice Nivat; Jean Vuillemin
- Doctoral students: Paul Zimmermann

Philippe Flajolet (French: [flaʒɔlɛ]; 1 December 1948 – 22 March 2011) was a French computer scientist.

== Biography ==
A former student of École Polytechnique, Philippe Flajolet received his PhD in computer science from University Paris Diderot in 1973 and state doctorate from Paris-Sud 11 University in 1979. Most of Philippe Flajolet's research work was dedicated towards general methods for analyzing the computational complexity of algorithms, including the theory of average-case complexity. He introduced the theory of analytic combinatorics. With Robert Sedgewick of Princeton University, he wrote the first book-length treatment of the topic, the 2009 book entitled Analytic Combinatorics. In 1993, together with Rainer Kemp, Helmut Prodinger and Robert Sedgewick, Flajolet initiated the successful series of workshops and conferences which was key to the development of a research community around the analysis of algorithms, and which evolved into the AofA—International Meeting on Combinatorial, Probabilistic, and Asymptotic Methods in the Analysis of Algorithms.

A summary of his research up to 1998 can be found in the article "Philippe Flajolet's research in Combinatorics and Analysis of Algorithms" by H. Prodinger and W. Szpankowski, Algorithmica 22 (1998), 366–387.

At the time of his death from a serious illness, Philippe Flajolet was a research director (senior research scientist) at INRIA in Rocquencourt.

From 1994 to 2003 he was a corresponding member of the French Academy of Sciences, and was a full member from 2003 on. He was also a member of the Academia Europaea.

== Memory ==
The HyperLogLog commands of Redis, released in April 2014, are prefixed with "PF" in honor of Philippe Flajolet. The Flajolet Lecture Prize, which has been awarded since 2014, was also named in honor of him.

Philippe Flajolet also received the 2019 Leroy P. Steele Prize from the American Mathematical Society for his work in Mathematical Exposition., more specifically, for his book Analytic Combinatorics, which he co-wrote with Robert Sedgewick.

== Selected works ==
- with Robert Sedgewick: An Introduction to the Analysis of Algorithms. 2nd edition, Addison-Wesley, Boston, Mass. 1995, ISBN 0-201-40009-X
- with Robert Sedgewick: Analytic Combinatorics. Cambridge University Press, Cambridge 2009, ISBN 978-0-521-89806-5
- Random tree models in the analysis of algorithms. INRIA, Rocquencourt 1987 (Rapports de recherche; Vol. 729)
- with Andrew Odlyzko: Singularity analysis of generating functions. University Press, Stanford, Calif. 1988
