= TokuDB =

Storage engine for MySQL, MariaDB and Percona Server

- Developer(s): Percona
- Stable release: 7.5.5 / January 29, 2015
- Repository: github.com/Tokutek/tokudb-engine
- Type: Database engine
- License: GNU General Public License (version 2)
- Website: Percona TokuDB

TokuDB is an open-source, high-performance storage engine for MySQL and MariaDB. It achieves this by using a fractal tree index. It is scalable, ACID and MVCC compliant, provides indexing-based query improvements, offers online schema modifications, and reduces replication lag for both hard disk drives and flash memory.

TokuDB is included in Percona Server, MariaDB and Nagios based opmon. However, it is deprecated in Percona Server 8 and MariaDB 10.5.

== Fractal tree indexes ==
=== Overview ===
TokuDB uses a Fractal tree index tree data structure that keeps data sorted and allows searches and sequential access in the same time as a B-tree but with insertions and deletions that are asymptotically faster than a B-tree. Fractal trees also allow for messages to be injected into the tree in such a fashion that schema changes (such as adding or dropping a column, or adding an index) can be done online and in the background. As a result, more indexes can be maintained without a drop in performance. This is because adding data to indexes tends to stress the performance of B-trees, but performs well in fractal tree indexes.

=== Uses ===
Fractal tree indexes can be applied to a number of applications characterized by near-real time analysis of streaming data. They can be used as the storage layer of a database or as the storage layer of a file system. When used in a database, they can be used in any setting where a B-tree is used, with improved performance. Examples include: network event management, online advertising networks, clickstream analytics, and air traffic control management. Other uses include accelerated crawler performance for search engines for social media sites. It can also be used to create indexes and columns online, enabling query flexibility for e-commerce personalization. It is also suited to improving performance and reducing existing loads on transactional websites. In general, it performs well in applications that must simultaneously store log file data and execute ad hoc queries.

=== Origins ===
This approach to building memory-efficient systems was originally jointly developed by researchers at the Massachusetts Institute of Technology, Rutgers University, and the Stony Brook University.

=== Role on the big data market ===
TokuDB is named as one of the technologies that enable big data in MySQL. Tokutek was a Startup Showcase Finalist at the O'Reilly Strata Conference 2012 on big data.

== See also ==
- Comparison of MySQL database engines
- NewSQL
- Database engine
