= Analytic combinatorics =

Field of combinatorics using complex analysis

Analytic combinatorics uses techniques from complex analysis to solve problems in enumerative combinatorics, specifically to find asymptotic estimates for the coefficients of generating functions.

== History ==
One of the earliest uses of analytic techniques for an enumeration problem came from Srinivasa Ramanujan and G. H. Hardy's work on integer partitions, starting in 1918, first using a Tauberian theorem and later the circle method.

Walter Hayman's 1956 paper "A Generalisation of Stirling's Formula" is considered one of the earliest examples of the saddle-point method.

In 1990, Philippe Flajolet and Andrew Odlyzko developed the theory of singularity analysis.

In 2009, Philippe Flajolet and Robert Sedgewick wrote the book Analytic Combinatorics, which presents analytic combinatorics with their viewpoint and notation.

Some of the earliest work on multivariate generating functions started in the 1970s using probabilistic methods.

Development of further multivariate techniques started in the early 2000s.

== Techniques ==
=== Meromorphic functions ===
If $h(z) = \frac{f(z)}{g(z)}$ is a meromorphic function and $a$ is its pole closest to the origin with order $m$, then

$[z^n] h(z) \sim \frac{(-1)^m m f(a)}{a^m g^{(m)}(a)} \left( \frac{1}{a} \right)^n n^{m-1} \quad$ as $n \to \infty$

where $[z^n] h(z)$ is the coefficient of $z^n$ in the Taylor expansion of $h(z)$ around $z=0$.

=== Tauberian theorem ===
If

$f(z) \sim \frac{1}{(1 - z)^\sigma} L(\frac{1}{1 - z}) \quad$ as $z \to 1$

where $\sigma > 0$ and $L$ is a slowly varying function, then

$[z^n]f(z) \sim \frac{n^{\sigma-1}}{\Gamma(\sigma)} L(n) \quad$ as $n \to \infty$

See also the Hardy–Littlewood Tauberian theorem.

=== Circle Method ===
For generating functions with logarithms or roots, which have branch singularities.

==== Darboux's method ====
If we have a function $(1 - z)^\beta f(z)$ where $\beta \notin \{0, 1, 2, \ldots\}$ and $f(z)$ has a radius of convergence greater than $1$ and a Taylor expansion near 1 of $\sum_{j\geq0} f_j (1 - z)^j$, then

$$[z^n](1 - z)^\beta f(z) = \sum_{j=0}^m f_j \frac{n^{-\beta-j-1}}{\Gamma(-\beta-j)} + O(n^{-m-\beta-2})$$

See Szegő (1975) for a similar theorem dealing with multiple singularities.

==== Singularity analysis ====
If $f(z)$ has a singularity at $\zeta$ and

$f(z) \sim \left(1 - \frac{z}{\zeta}\right)^\alpha \left(\frac{1}{\frac{z}{\zeta}}\log\frac{1}{1 - \frac{z}{\zeta}}\right)^\gamma \left(\frac{1}{\frac{z}{\zeta}}\log\left(\frac{1}{\frac{z}{\zeta}}\log\frac{1}{1 - \frac{z}{\zeta}}\right)\right)^\delta \quad$ as $z \to \zeta$

where $\alpha \notin \{0, 1, 2, \cdots\}, \gamma, \delta \notin \{1, 2, \cdots\}$ then

$[z^n]f(z) \sim \zeta^{-n} \frac{n^{-\alpha-1}}{\Gamma(-\alpha)} (\log n)^\gamma (\log\log n)^\delta \quad$ as $n \to \infty$

=== Saddle-point method ===
For generating functions including entire functions.

Intuitively, the biggest contribution to the contour integral is around the saddle point and estimating near the saddle-point gives us an estimate for the whole contour.

If $F(z)$ is an admissible function, then

$[z^n] F(z) \sim \frac{F(\zeta)}{\zeta^{n+1} \sqrt{2 \pi f^{''}(\zeta)}} \quad$ as $n \to \infty$

where $F^'(\zeta) = 0$.

See also the method of steepest descent.

== See also ==
- Symbolic method (combinatorics)
- Analytic Combinatorics (book)
