= David P. Woodruff =

American computer scientist

- Born: 1980
- Education: Massachusetts Institute of Technology (BS, MEng, PhD)
- Awards: Presburger Award (2014); Simons Investigator (2020)
- Scientific career
- Workplaces: Carnegie Mellon University
- Thesis: Efficient and private distance approximation in the communication and streaming models
- Doctoral advisor: Piotr Indyk
- Website: www.cs.cmu.edu/~dwoodruf/

David Paul Woodruff (born 1980) is a professor in the Department of Computer Science at Carnegie Mellon University. He completed his PhD at MIT in 2007. His research contributions include an asymptotically optimal streaming algorithm for the count-distinct problem, which received the best paper award at the 2010 Symposium on Principles of Database Systems. He has also co-developed randomized algorithms for linear regression and low-rank approximation, which were recognized with a best paper award at the 2013 Symposium on Theory of Computing.
