= Elisa E. Konofagou =

Greek biomedical engineer

- Born: Paris, France
- Education: BSc, Chemical physics, Paris VI University; MSc, biomedical engineering, 1993, Imperial College London; PhD, 1999, University of Houston
- Spouse: Simos Simeonidis
- Scientific career
- Institutions: Fu Foundation School of Engineering and Applied Science
- Thesis: Estimation and imaging of three-dimensional motion and Poisson's ratio in elastography (1999)
- Doctoral advisor: Jonathan Ophir

Elisa Eugenia Konofagou is a Greek biomedical engineer in the field of medical ultrasound. She is the Robert and Margaret Hariri Professor of Biomedical Engineering and Radiology (Physics) at Columbia University's Fu Foundation School of Engineering and Applied Science. She is the Founder of Delsona Therapeutics, a company that uses Focused Ultrasound to treat neurological and oncology indications.

Konofagou is a Fellow of the National Academy of Medicine, the National Academy of Inventors, the Acoustical Society of America and the American Institute for Medical and Biological Engineering.

== Early life and education ==
Konofagou was born in Paris, France, but finished high school at Varvakeio High School in Greece. Both of her parents have PhDs, her father in chemical engineering and her mother in economics, Konofagou graduated with a Bachelor of science in chemical physics at the Paris VI University in 1992 and earned her master's degree in biomedical engineering from Imperial College London in 1993. She then earned her Doctor of Philosophy in 1999 from the University of Houston. Her PhD studies focused on developing elastography for breast cancer diagnosis. Konofagou then completed postdoctoral research in elasticity-based monitoring of focused ultrasound therapy at Brigham and Women's Hospital.

== Academic career ==
Following her postdoctoral training, Konofagou remained at Brigham and Women's Hospital as an instructor until 2003. She then became an assistant professor of Biomedical Engineering at Columbia University. In 2005, Konofagou used ultrasound technology to noninvasively penetrate the blood–brain barrier. As a result, she received the 2006 New Investigator Award from the American Institute of Ultrasound in Medicine. Throughout her early tenure at Columbia, Konofagou led a research team in developing Electromechanical Wave Imaging (EWI) as a non-invasive direct technique to map the electrical activation of the heart. By using EWI, Konofagou and her research team were able to image the heart with ultrasound five times faster than standard echocardiography and map the local deformations of the heart. She also developed a new technique using short ultrasound pulses to reach neurons through the blood-brain barrier. In 2014, Konofagou was elected a Fellow of the American Institute for Medical and Biological Engineering and promoted to the rank of Full Professor.

Konofagou was appointed the Robert and Margaret Hariri Professor of Biomedical Engineering at Columbia University in 2016. While in this role, she co-patented a non-invasive system and methodology for neuromodulation using focused ultrasound (FUS). Konofagou and her research team then used FUS to facilitate targeted drug delivery into the brain and enable drugs to treat brain diseases more focally. By 2020, her research laboratory had begun a clinical trial to open the blood-brain barrier in patients with Alzheimer's disease. Konofagou efforts were recognized in 2021 with two elections to learned societies. She was elected a member of the National Academy of Medicine for her "leadership and innovation in ultrasound imaging and therapeutics in medical practice and treatment" and elevated to IEEE Fellow for her "contributions to the use of ultrasound for cardiovascular and cancer diagnosis, neuromodulation, and brain drug delivery."

== Awards and honors ==
Konofagou has received numerous recognitions throughout her career, including:

- Elected Fellow of the National Academy of Medicine for leadership in ultrasound and imaging and therapeutics.
- Elected Fellow of the Institute of Electrical and Electronics Engineers (IEEE) for contribution to ultrasound on cardiovascular and cancer diagnosis, neuromodulation, and brain drug delivery.
- Fellow of the National Academy of Inventors (2025) for breakthrough ultrasound technologies in noninvasive medicine.
- Bodossaki Foundation Distinguished Young Scientists Award (2017) for outstanding achievements in ultrasound imaging research.
