= God Loves Caviar =

2012 drama film

- Film poster
- Directed by: Yannis Smaragdis
- Written by: Yannis Smaragdis
- Produced by: Eleni Smaragdi
- Starring: Sebastian Koch; Yevgeny Stychkin; Juan Diego Botto; Olga Sutulova; John Cleese; Catherine Deneuve
- Cinematography: Aris Stavrou
- Release dates: 6 September 2012 (TIFF); 11 October 2012 (Greece)
- Running time: 99 minutes
- Countries: Greece; Russia
- Languages: English; Greek

God Loves Caviar (Greek: Ο Θεός αγαπάει το χαβιάρι, translit. O Theós agapáei to chaviári; in Russia known as Pirates of the Aegean Sea) is a 2012 Russian-Greek drama film written and directed by Yannis Smaragdis.

== Plot ==
The film is based upon the true story of Ioannis Varvakis, a Greek caviar merchant and eventual benefactor from Psara who was formerly a pirate. He was born in Psara, and from an early age he learned to navigate the seas, an occupation revered and steeped in tradition on the island where he grew up. At the age of 17 he built his own ship, which he would later offer to the Russians during the Orlov Revolt. Ultimately, his ship was destroyed, and he turned to Saint Petersburg to ask for an audience with Catherine the Great. He was given compensation for the loss of his ship and granted authorization to fish freely in the Caspian Sea. Due to his superb navigational skills and excellent seamanship abilities, he dominated the Caspian Sea and soon became substantially wealthy. When he initially discovered the superior caviar of the Beluga Sturgeon, he quickly realized that there could be an incredible market trading for this product. From the caviar trade he eventually became a millionaire and later donated part of his fortune for important works that improved the life of Russians and Greeks on the Black Sea coasts. In his later years, he became a member of the Filiki Eteria, which would contribute to the overthrow of the Ottoman rule of Greece. He died in 1825 in Zante, during the Greek War of Independence. After his death, his entire estate went to the Ioannis Varvakis Foundation which would offer up important grants throughout Greece. The script follows the entire life of Varvakis, but the film's narration begins with his final moments in Zante.

== Cast ==
- Sebastian Koch as Ioannis Varvakis
- Yevgeny Stychkin as Ivan
- Juan Diego Botto as Alexios Lefentarios
- Olga Sutulova as Helena Romachoff
- John Cleese as McCormick
- Catherine Deneuve as Empress Catherine II of Russia
- Akis Sakellariou as Kimon
- Nick Ashdon as British Ambassador
- Marisha Triantafyllidou as Maria Varvakis
- Alexandra Sakelaropoulou as Varvakis' Mother
- Fotini Baxevani as Ludmilla
- Christoforos Papakaliatis as Grigori Potemkin
- Lakis Lazopoulos as Fisherman of God
- Irene Balta as Varvakis' Wife
- Pavlos Kontoyannidis as Shipbuilder
- Alexandros Mylonas as Temporary Prime Minister
- Yannis Vouros as Businessman A
- Manos Vakousis as Businessman B
- Giorgos Ktenavos as Andreas Varvakis
- Kris Radanov as Alexei Orlov
- Giorgos Kotanidis as Theodoros Kolokotronis

== Reception ==
The film was one of the official selections that debuted in 2012 Toronto Film Festival. In 2013 the film was the highest-grossing film in Greece.
