= Kalai Prize =

The Prize in Game Theory and Computer Science in Honour of Ehud Kalai is an award given by the Game Theory Society. The prize is awarded for outstanding articles at the interface of game theory and computer science. Following the eligibility rules of the Gödel Prize, preference is given to authors who are 45 years old or younger at the time of the award. It was established in 2008 by a donation from Yoav Shoham in honor of the Ehud Kalai's contributions in bridging these two fields.

== Recipients ==
Year	Recipients	Article
2008	Constantinos Daskalakis; Paul W. Goldberg; Christos Papadimitriou	The Complexity of Computing a Nash Equilibrium
2012	Benjamin Edelman; Michael Ostrovsky; Michael Schwarz; Hal Varian	Internet Advertising and the Generalized-Second Price Auction: Selling Billions of Dollars worth of Keywords and Position Auctions
2016	Tim Roughgarden	Intrinsic Robustness of the Price of Anarchy
2021	Yakov Babichenko Aviad Rubinstein	Communication Complexity of Approximate Nash Equilibria
2024	Ioannis Caragiannis David Kurokawa; Hervé Moulin; Ariel D. Procaccia; Nisarg Shah; Junxing Wang	The Unreasonable Fairness of Maximum Nash Welfare

== See also ==
- List of economics awards
- List of prizes named after people
- John Bates Clark Medal
