= Vladimir Borovikovsky =

Russian artist (1757–1825)

- Владимир Боровиковский
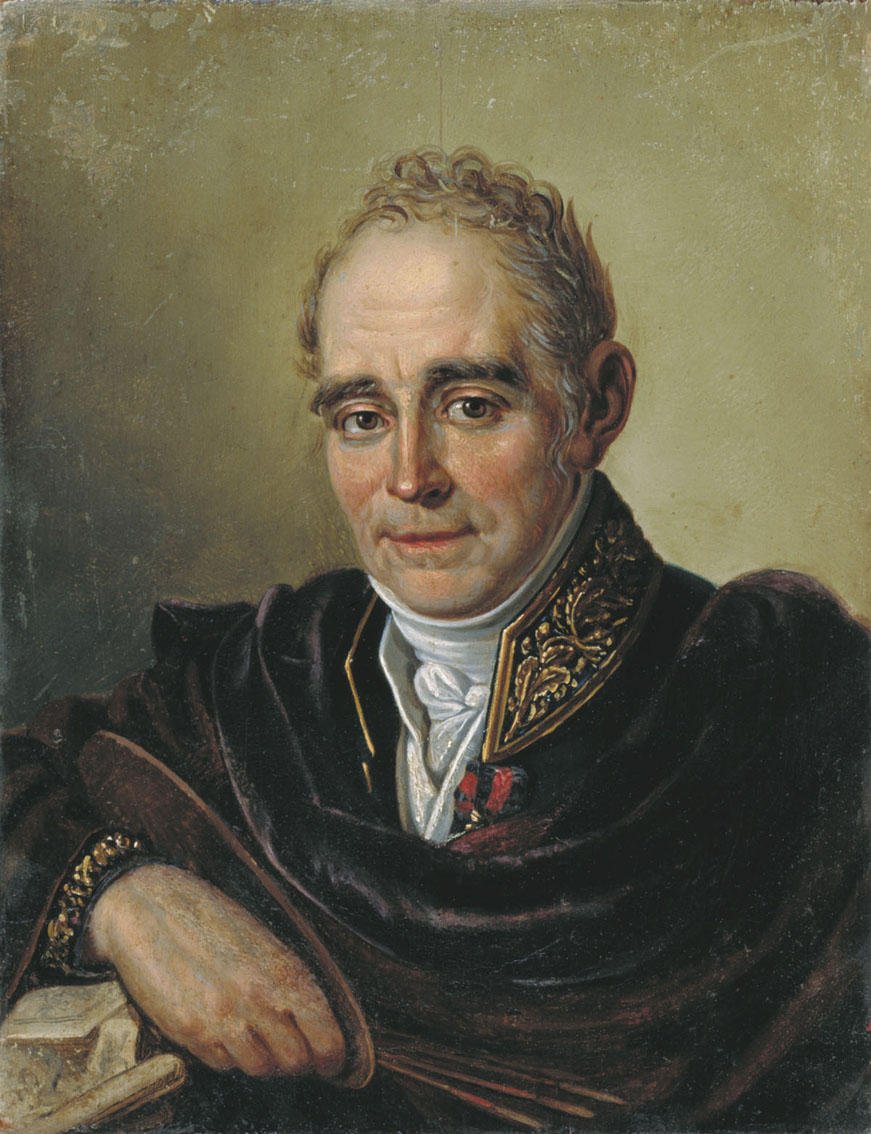
- Portrait by Ivan Bugaevsky-Blagodarny (1824)
- Born: Vladimir Lukich Borovikovsky; 4 August [O.S. 24 July] 1757; Mirgorod, Cossack Hetmanate, Russian Empire
- Died: 18 April [O.S. 6 April] 1825 (aged 67); St. Petersburg, Russian Empire
- Education: Member Academy of Arts (1795)
- Known for: Painting
- Movement: Orientalist

Vladimir Lukich Borovikovsky (Note: Russian: Владимир Лукич Боровиковский; Ukrainian: Володимир Лукич Боровиковський, romanized: Volodymyr Lukych Borovykovskyi) (4 August [O.S. 24 July] 1757 – 18 April [O.S. 6 April] 1825) was a Russian artist of Ukrainian Cossack origin. He served at the court of Catherine the Great and dominated portraiture in Russia at the turn of the 19th century.

== Biography ==
Vladimir Borovikovsky was born in Mirgorod, Cossack Hetmanate, Russian Empire (now Ukraine) on July 24, 1757 into a family of Ukrainian Cossack origin. His father, Luka Borovik, was an icon-painter. According to the family tradition, all four of Borovik's sons served as Cossacks in Mirgorod regiment, but Vladimir retired early at the rank of poruchik and devoted his life to art — mostly icon painting for local churches.

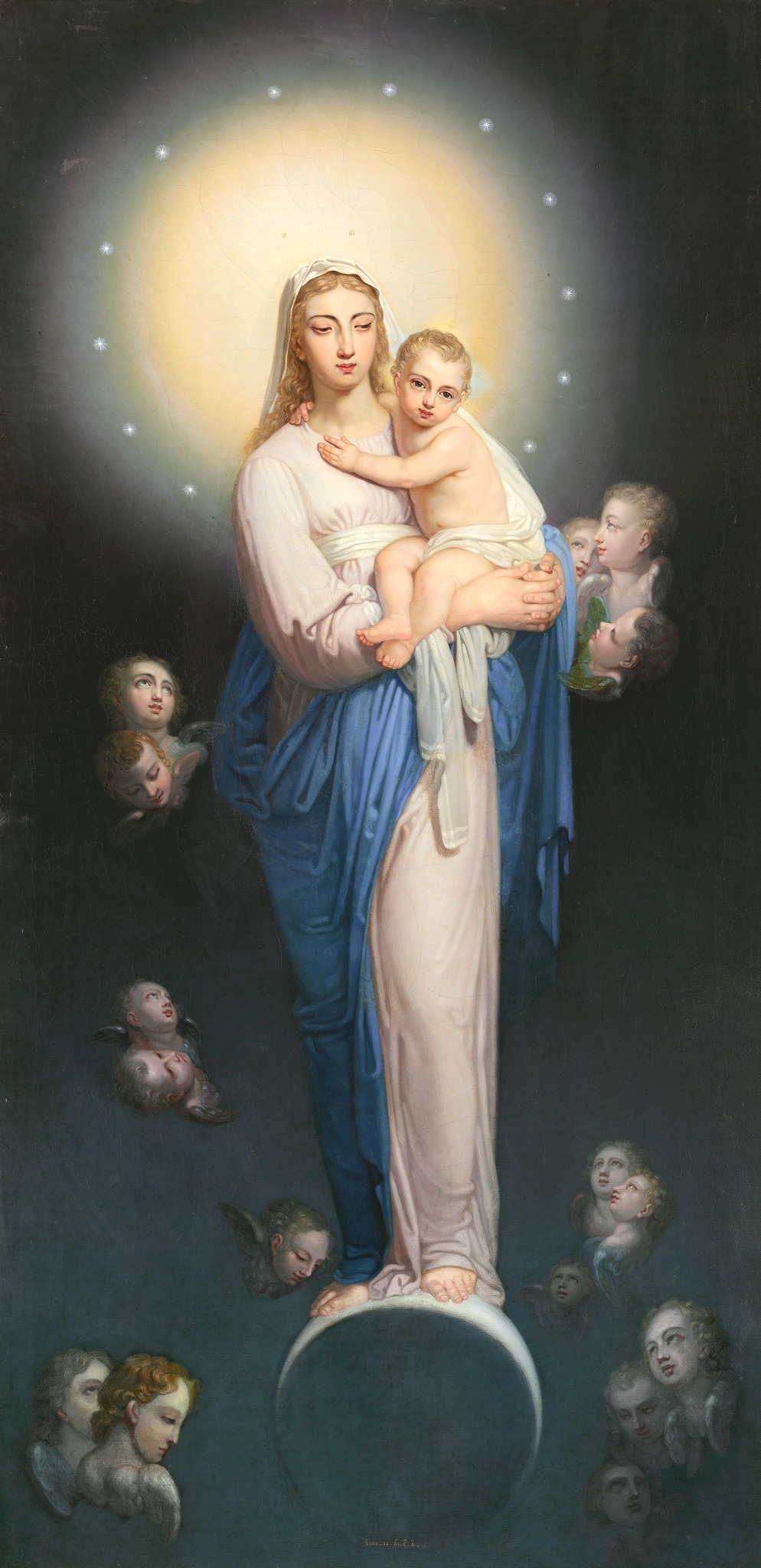
Virgin Mary

Borovikovsky lived in Mirgorod until 1788, where he painted icons and portraits in the Cossack Baroque tradition. His friend Vasily Kapnist was preparing an accommodation for Empress Catherine II in Kremenchuk during her travel to newly conquered Crimea. Kapnist asked Borovikovsky to paint two allegoric paintings (Peter I of Russia and Catherine II as peasants sowing seeds and Catherine II as a Minerva) for her rooms. The paintings so pleased the Empress that she requested that the painter move to Saint Petersburg.

After September 1788 Borovikovsky lived in Saint Petersburg where he changed his surname from the Cossack Borovik to the more aristocratic-sounding Borovikovsky. For his first ten years in Saint Petersburg, he lived in the house of the poet, architect, musician and art theorist, Prince Nikolay Lvov, whose ideas strongly influenced Borovikovsky's art. At the age of 30 years, he was too old to attend St. Petersburg Imperial Academy of Arts, so he took private lessons from Dmitry Levitzky and later from Austrian painter Johann Baptist Lampi.

In 1795 he was appointed an academician. He became a popular portrait painter and created about 500 portraits during his lifetime, 400 of which survived to the 21st century. He had his own studio, and often relied on assistants to paint the less important parts of a portrait. His sitters included members of the imperial family, courtiers, generals, many aristocrats, and figures from the Russian artistic and literary worlds. Most of his portraits are intimate in style.

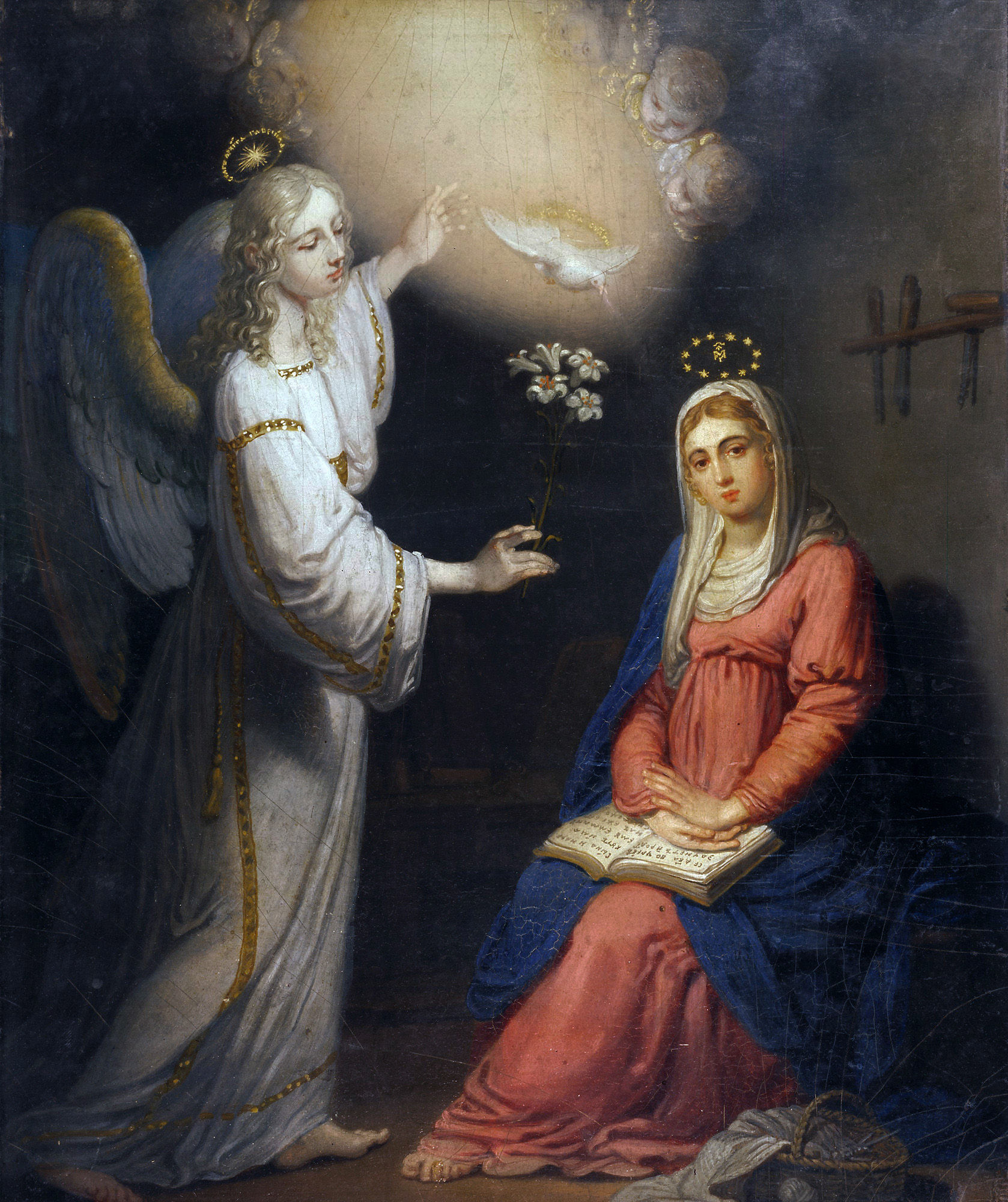
The Annunciation

The most notable are:

- Portrait of Catherine II, Empress of Russia (1794)
- Portrait of E. N. Arsenyeva (1796)
- Portrait of M. I. Lopukhina (1797)
- Portrait of F. A. Borovsky (1799)
- Portrait of Paul I, Emperor of Russia (1800)
- Portrait of Prince A. B. Kurakin (1801–1802)
- Portrait of Princess A. G. Gagarina and Princess V. G. Gagarina (1802).
- Portrait of Serbian Prince Karadjordje 1816

Borovikovsky never taught in the Imperial Academy of Art but pupils lived in his home. Among them were Alexey Venetsianov and Bugaevsky-Blagodarny (who painted the only survived portrait of Vladimir Borovikovsky).

After 1819 Borovikovsky became a Freemason, member of a lodge Dying Sphinx. At that time he mostly painted icons, including Iconostasis of the Smolensky Cemetery church and some icons for Kazan Cathedral in Saint Petersburg.

On April 6, 1825 he died suddenly of a heart attack and was interred in the Lazarevskoe Cemetery of the Alexander Nevsky Lavra in Saint Petersburg.

== Characteristics of the works ==
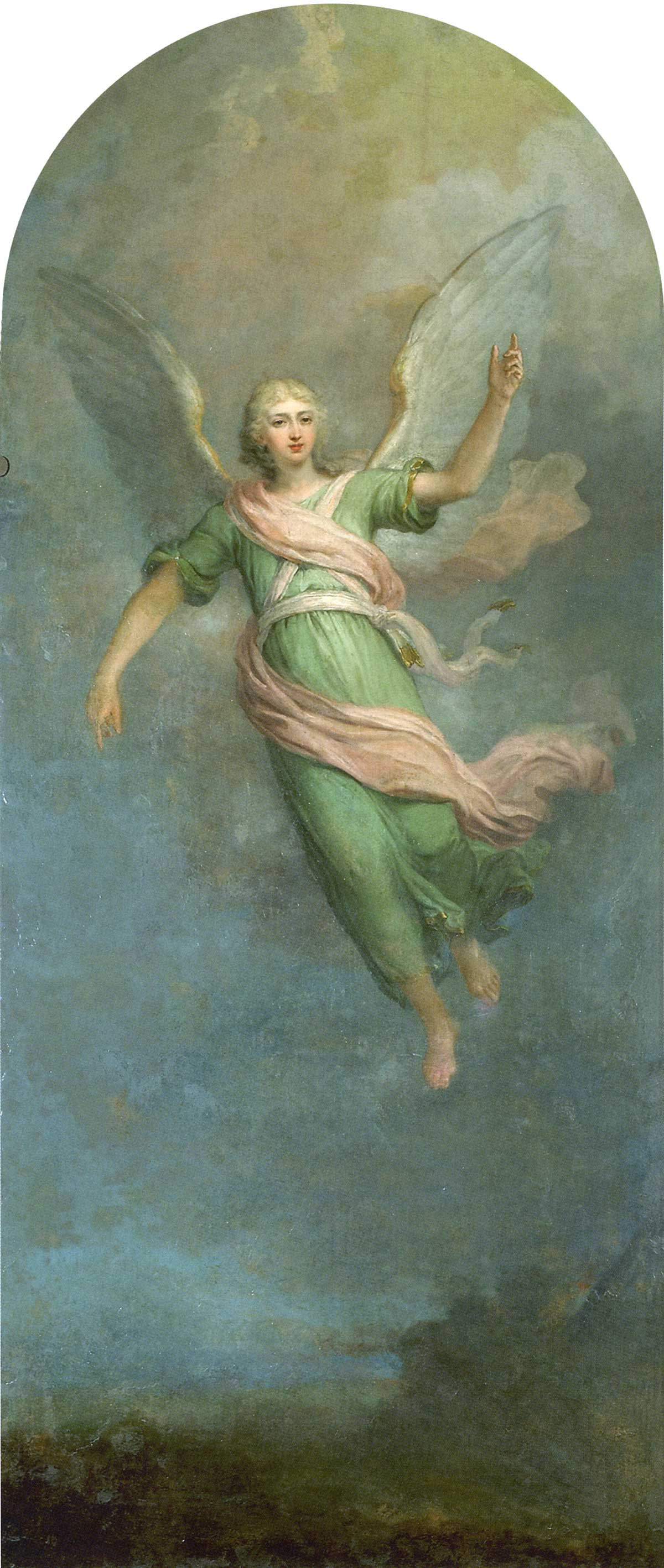
The Archangel Gabriel

In the late 1790s, Borovikovsky gains fame as a famous portrait painter. He painted with his left hand.

His work is dominated by chamber portraits. In female images, Borovikovsky embodies the ideal of beauty of his era.

The artist subtly conveys the inner world of the people he portrays. In a chamber, sentimental portrait with limited emotional expression, the master can convey the diversity of innermost feelings and experiences of the models portrayed. For the canvas "Catherine II for a walk in the Tsarskoselsky park (1794), submitted to the Academy of Arts, Borovikovsky was appointed an academician.

In the 1810s Borovikovsky attracted a strong, energetic personality, he focuses on the citizenship, nobility, dignity of the portrayed. The appearance of his models becomes more restrained, the landscape background is replaced by a depiction of the interior.

В. Borovikovsky painted several ceremonial portraits. Borovikovsky's ceremonial portraits show the brush's mastery of texture: the softness of velvet, the brilliance of gilded and satin vestments, and the sparkle of precious stones.

The work of Borovikovsky is a fusion of classicist and sentimental styles.

In his later years, Borovikovsky returned to religious painting, including several icons for the ongoing construction of the Kazan Cathedral and the iconostasis of the Church of Smolensk cemetery in St. Petersburg. He gave painting lessons to the then aspiring artist Alexey Venetsianov.

== Religious paintings ==
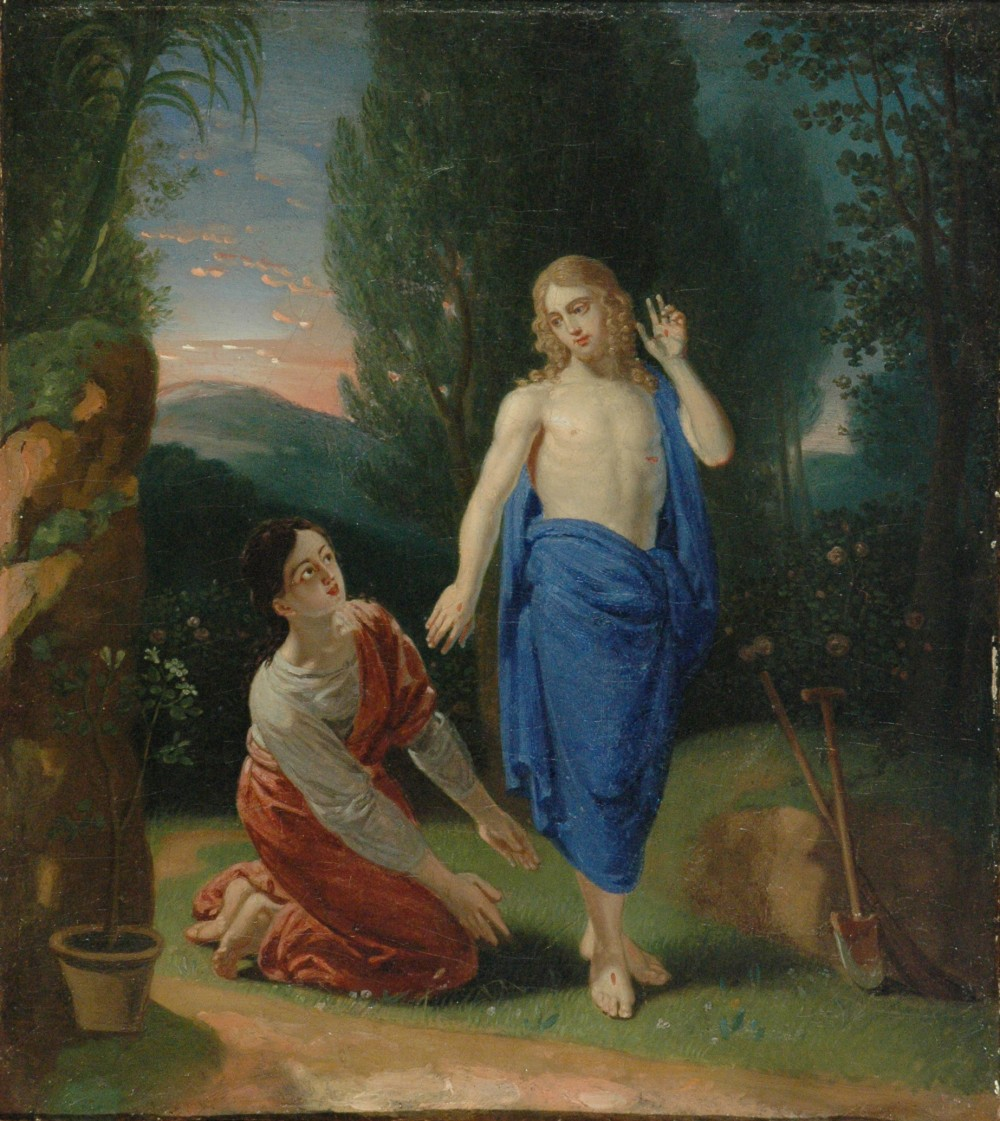
The Appearance of Christ to Mary Magdalene

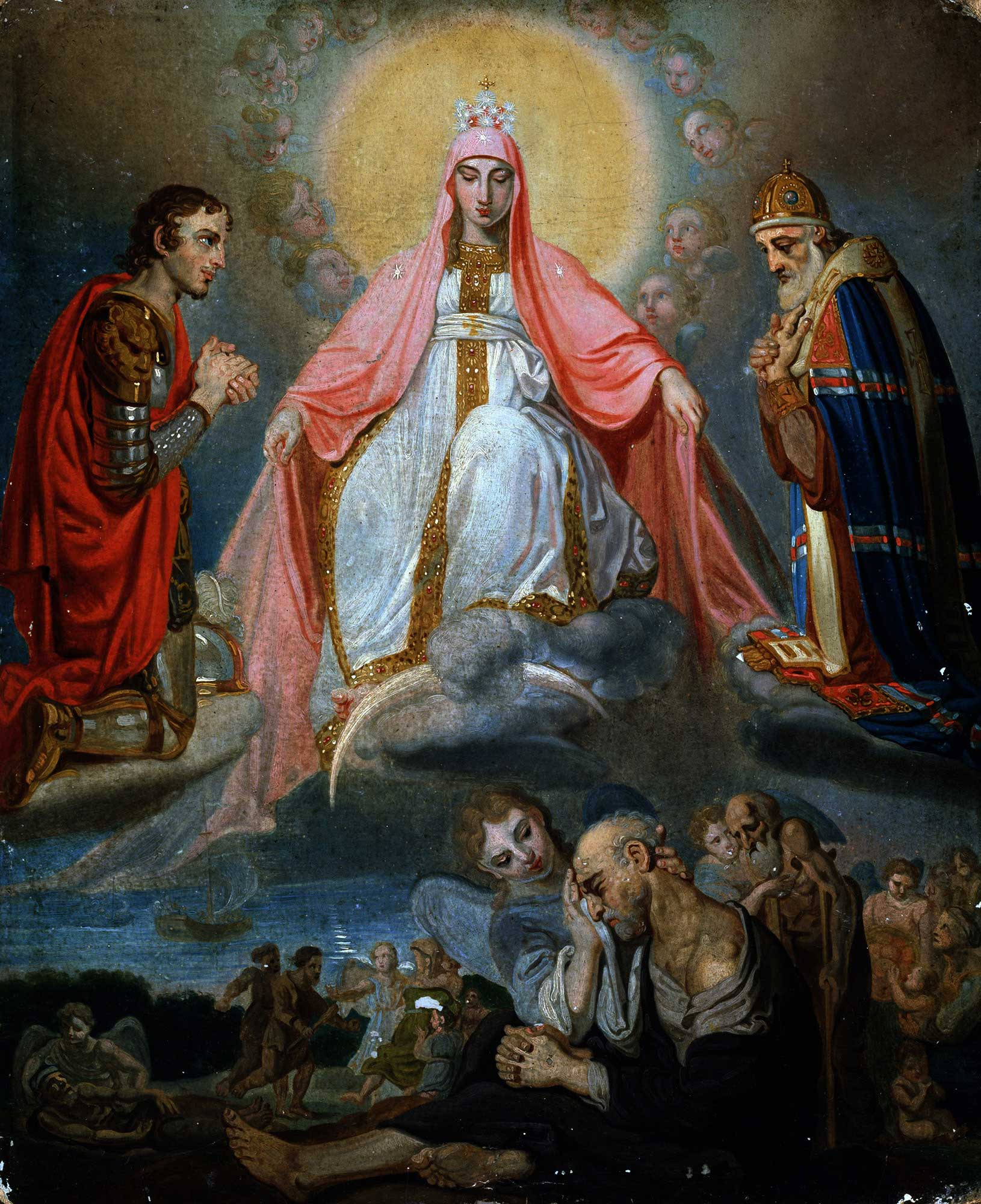
Our Lady of Sorrows

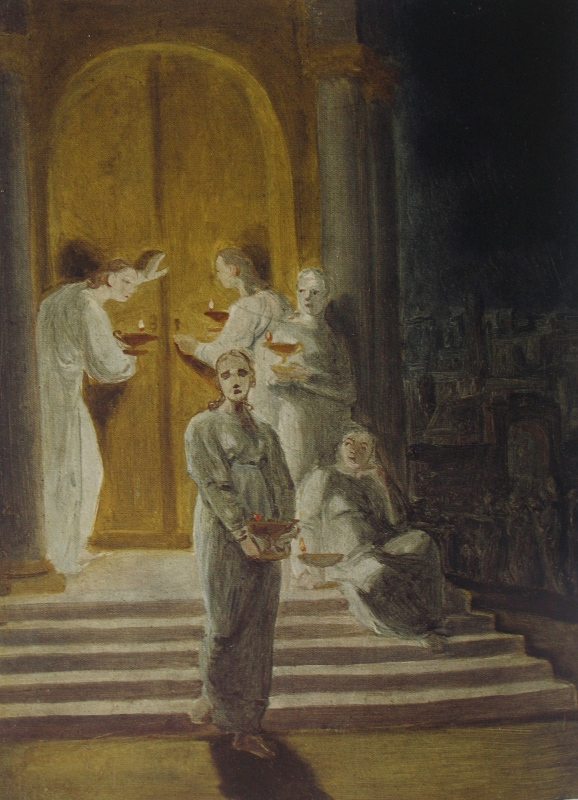
Parable of the Wise and Foolish Virgins (1825)

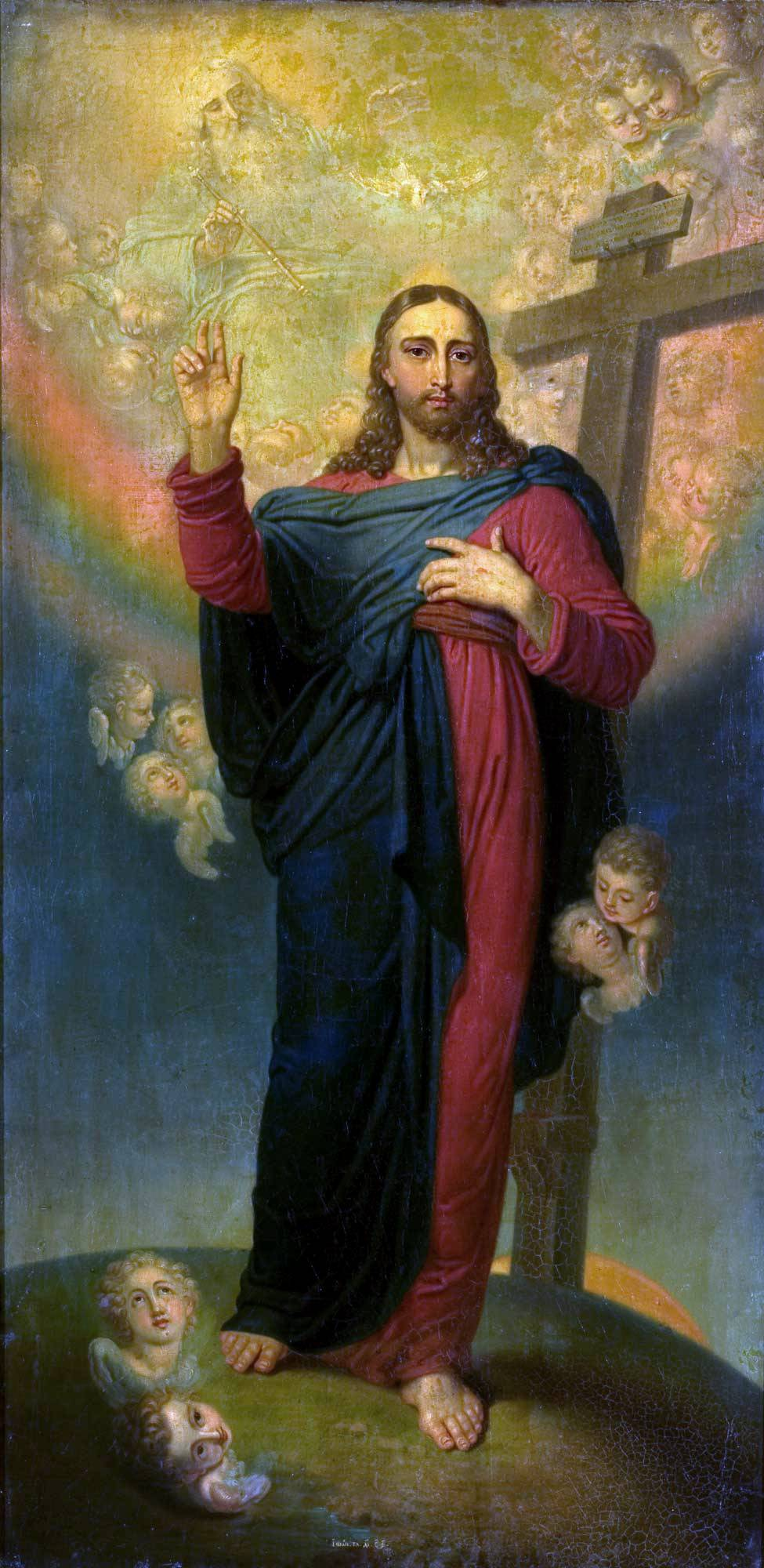
Christ the Saviour (1815)

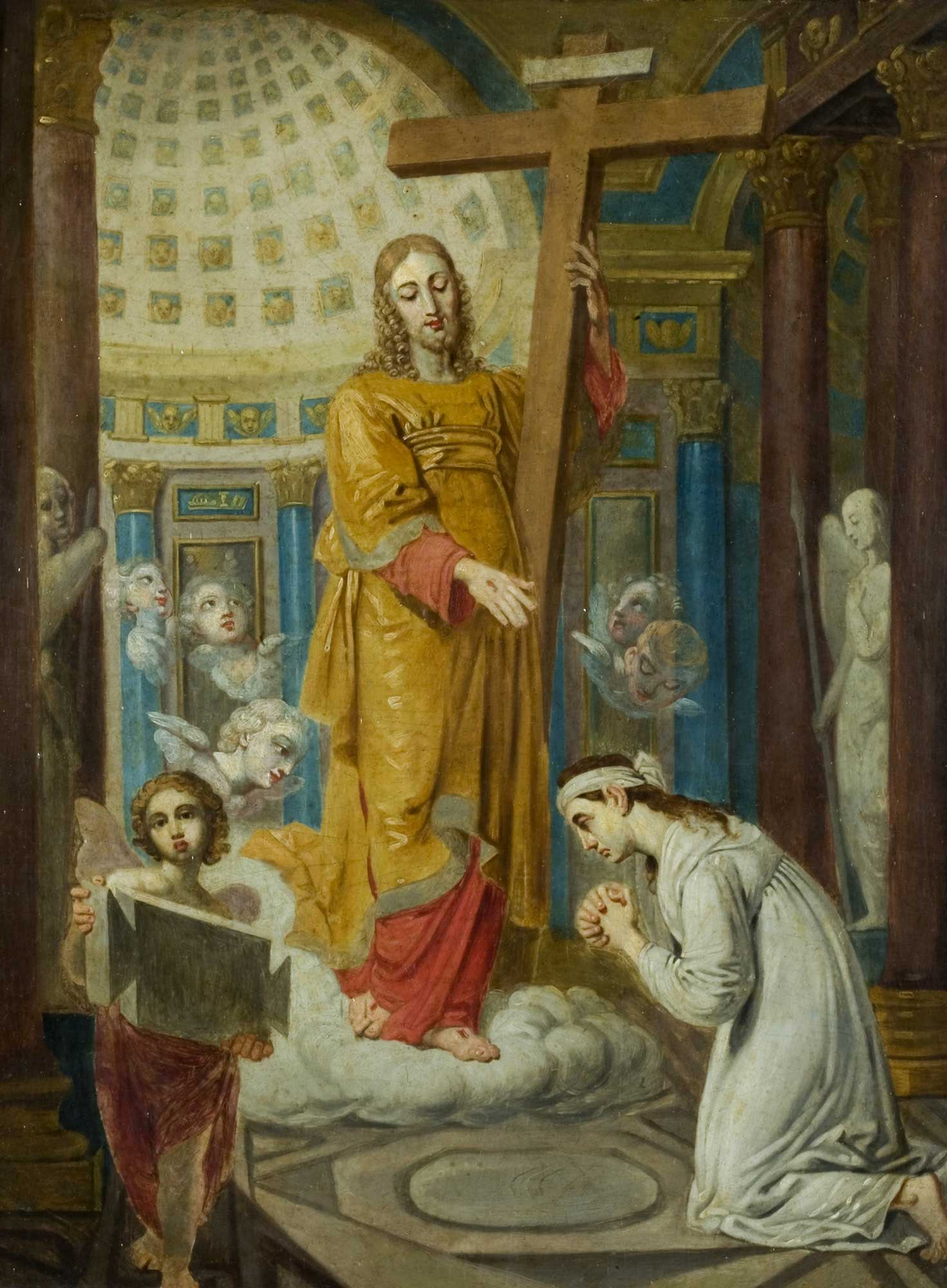
Jesus Christ with the Golgotha cross

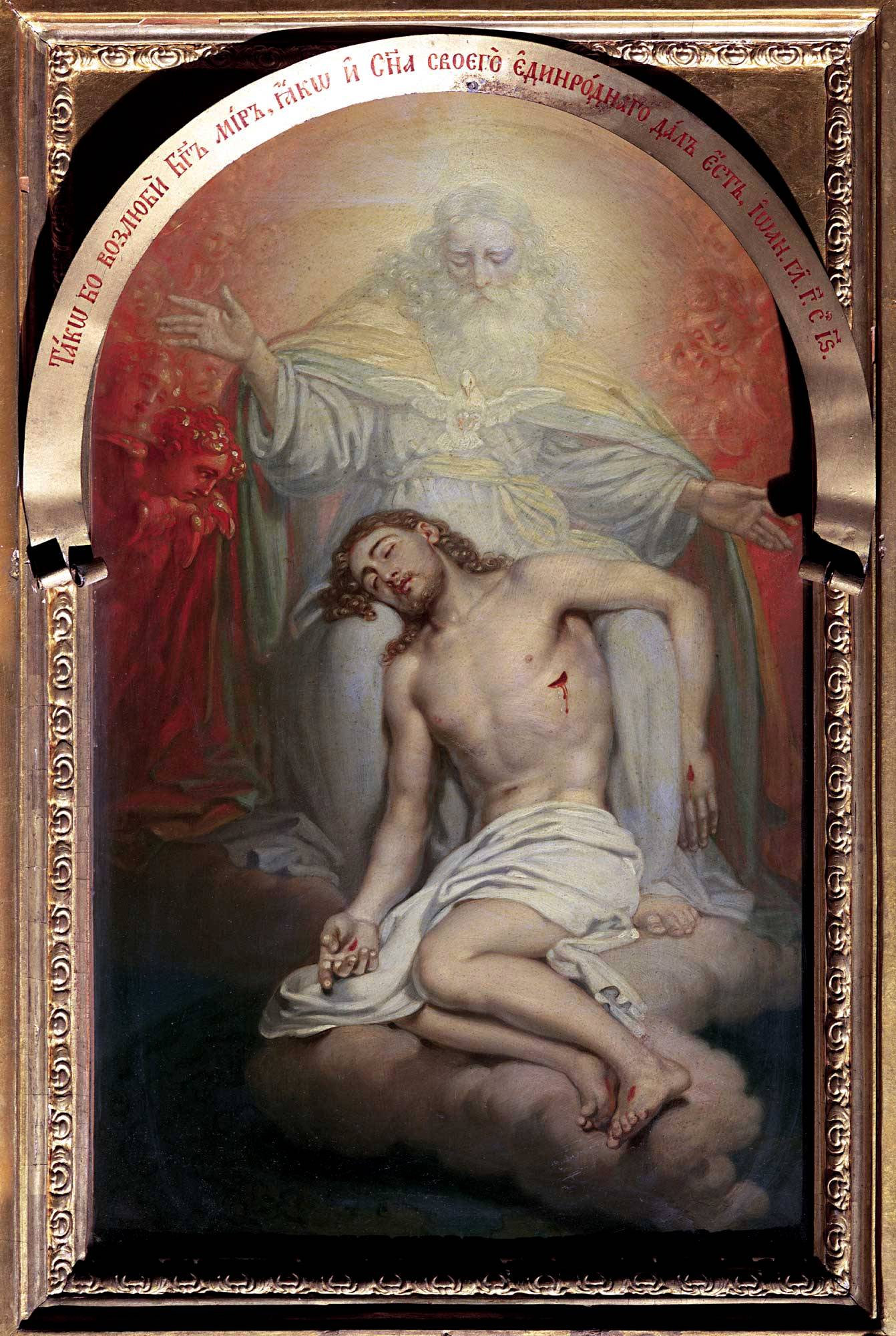
God the Father contemplating dead Christ

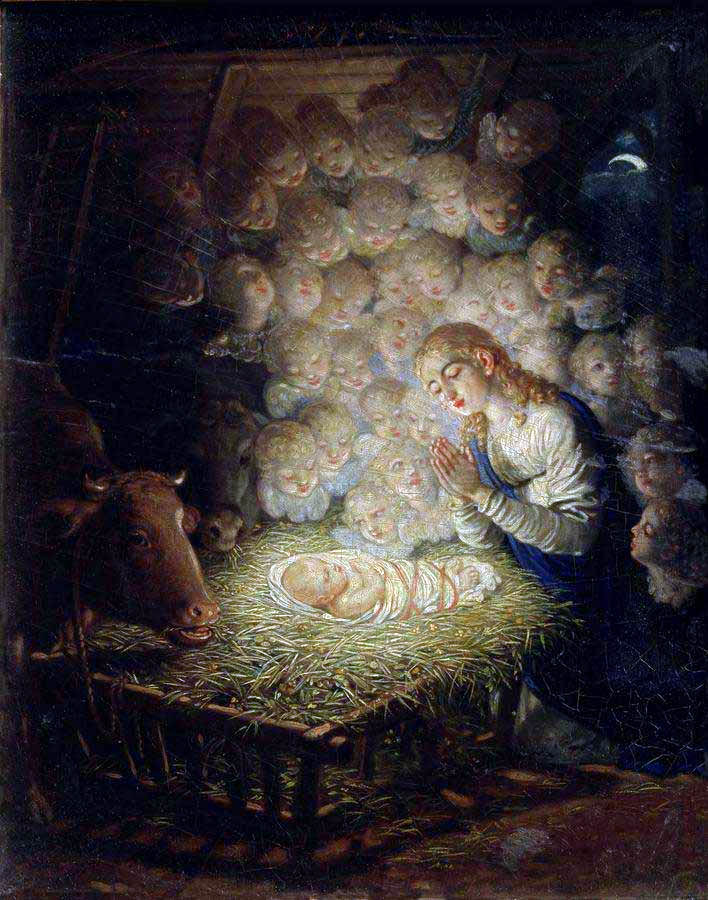
Christmas, depicting the nativity

== Portraits ==
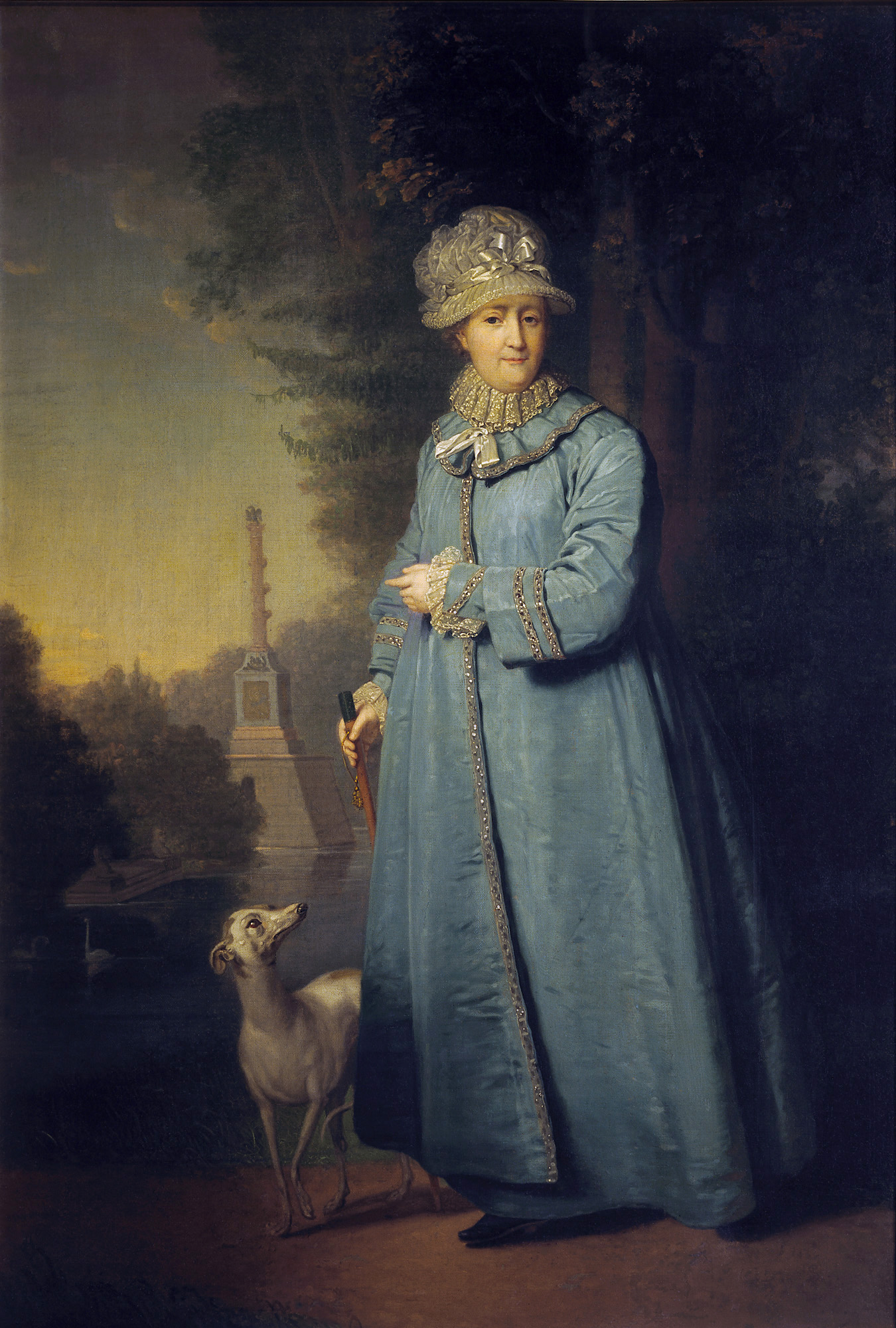
Catherine II in Tsarskoe Selo (1794)

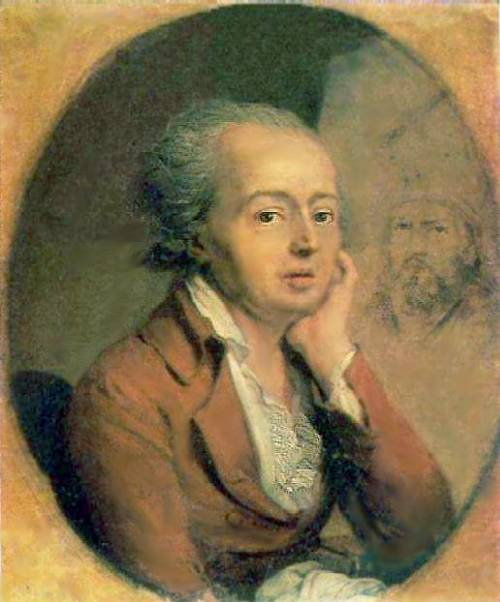
Portrait of Dmitry Levitzky (1796)

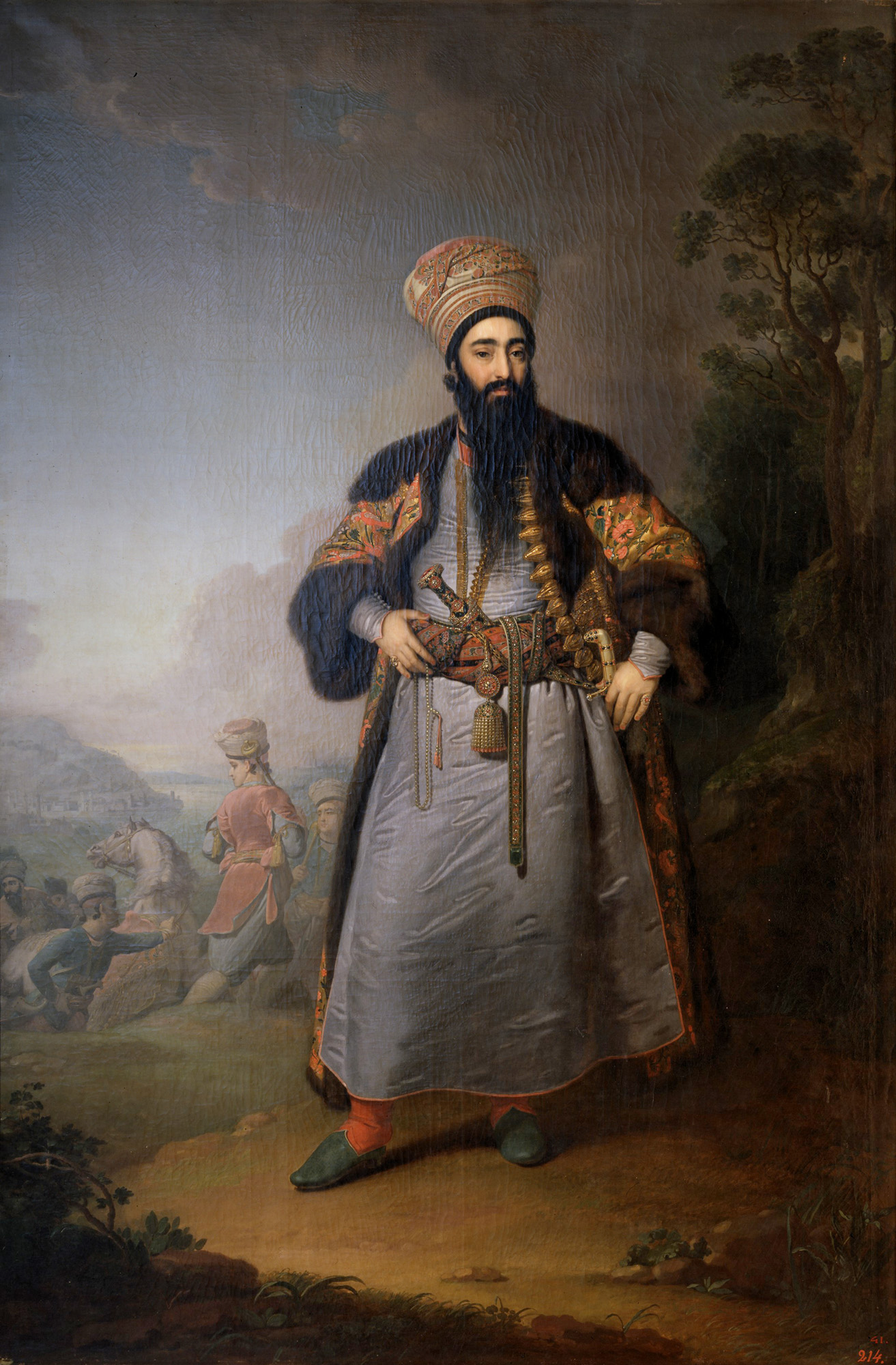
Portrait of Morteza Qoli Khan Qajar (1796)

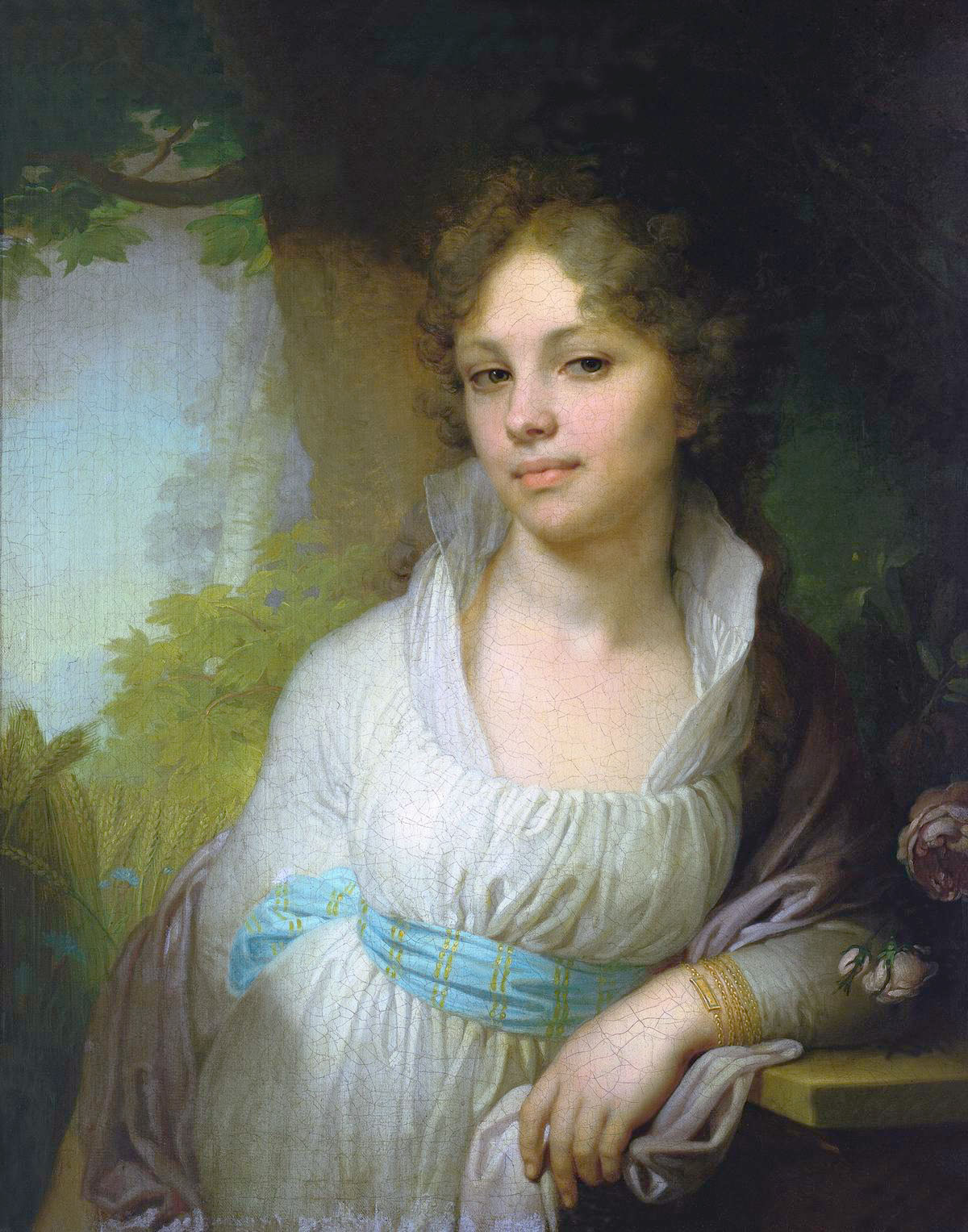
Portrait of Maria Lopukhina (1797)

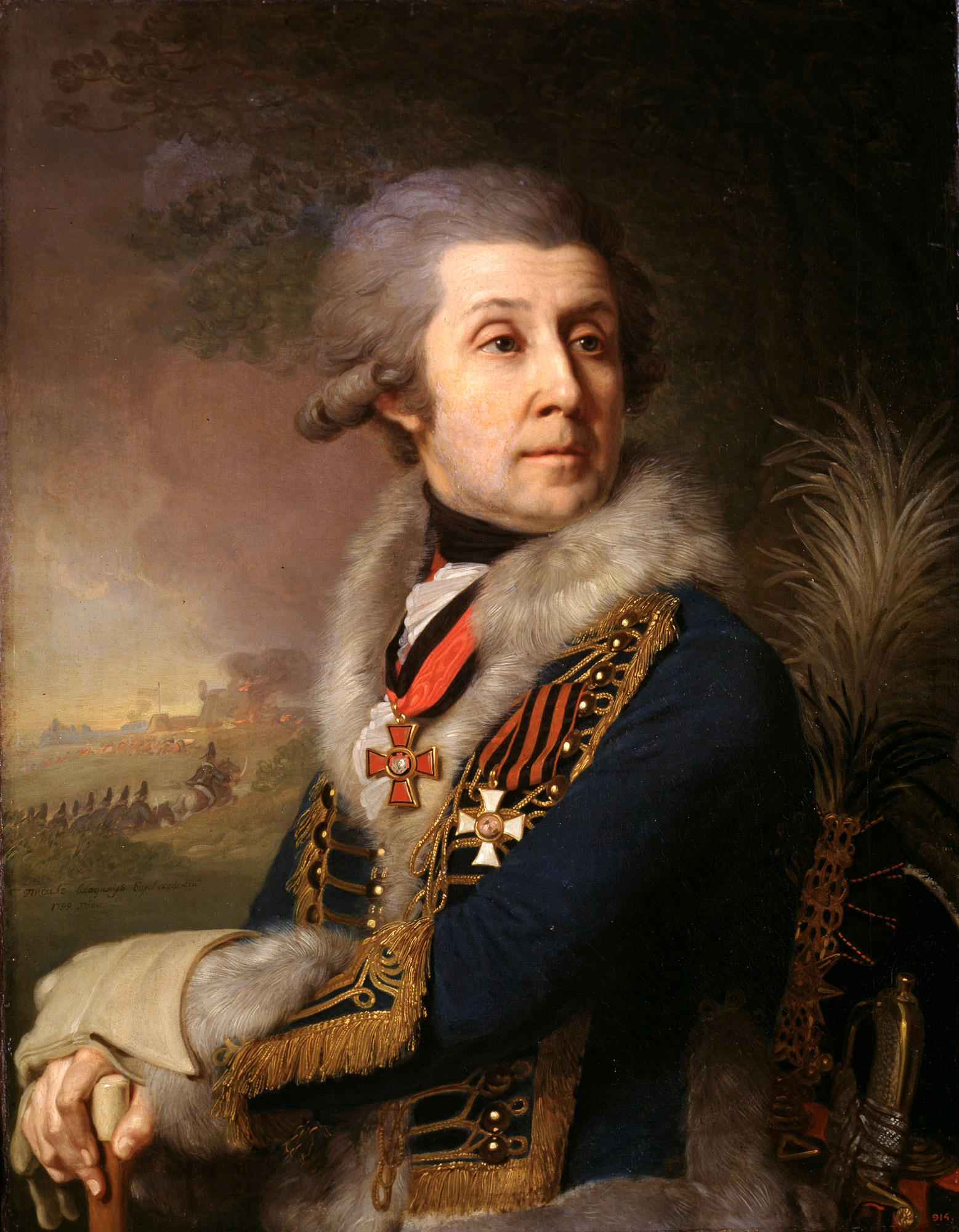
Portrait of F. A. Borovsky (1799)

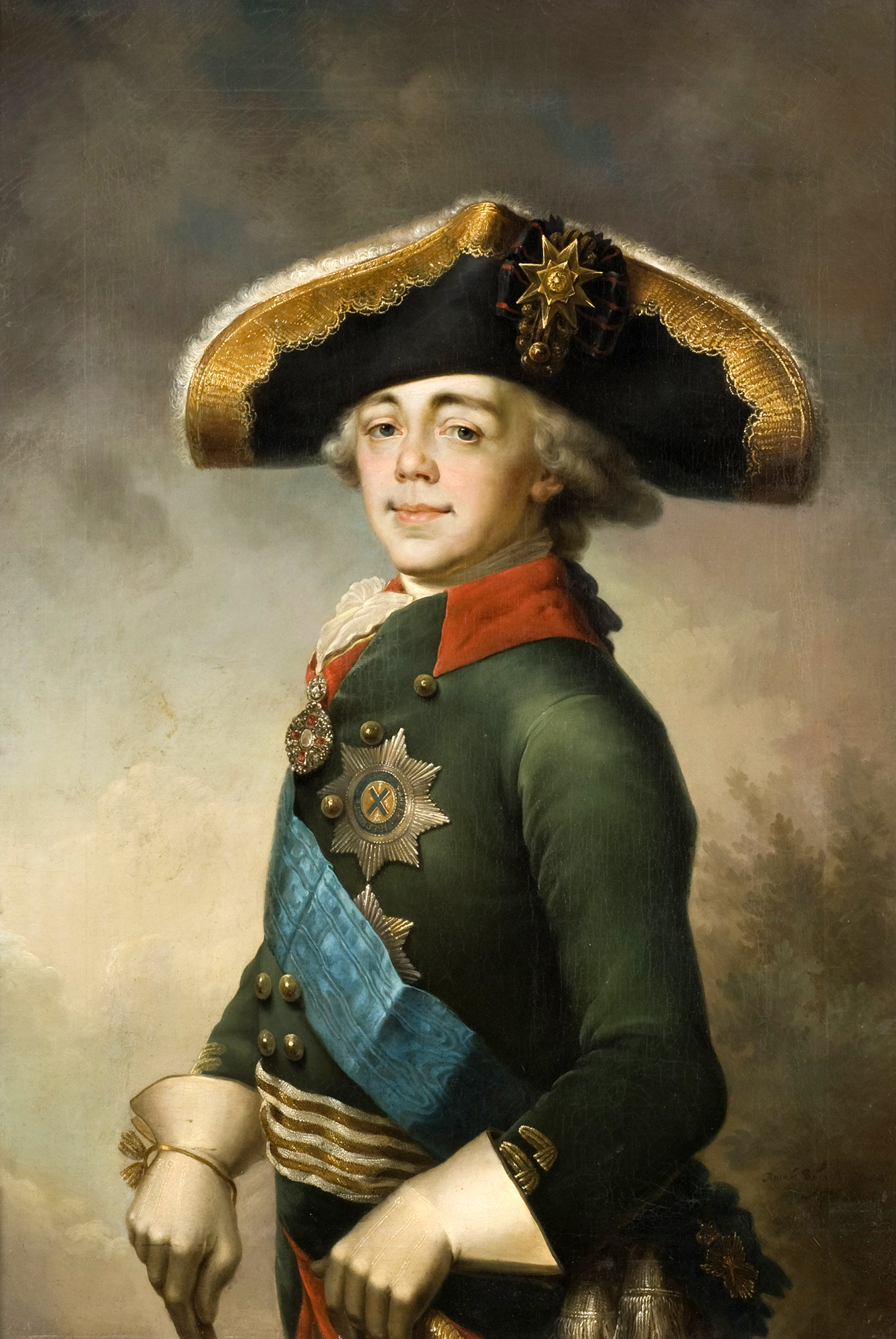
Portrait of Paul I, Emperor of Russia (1800)

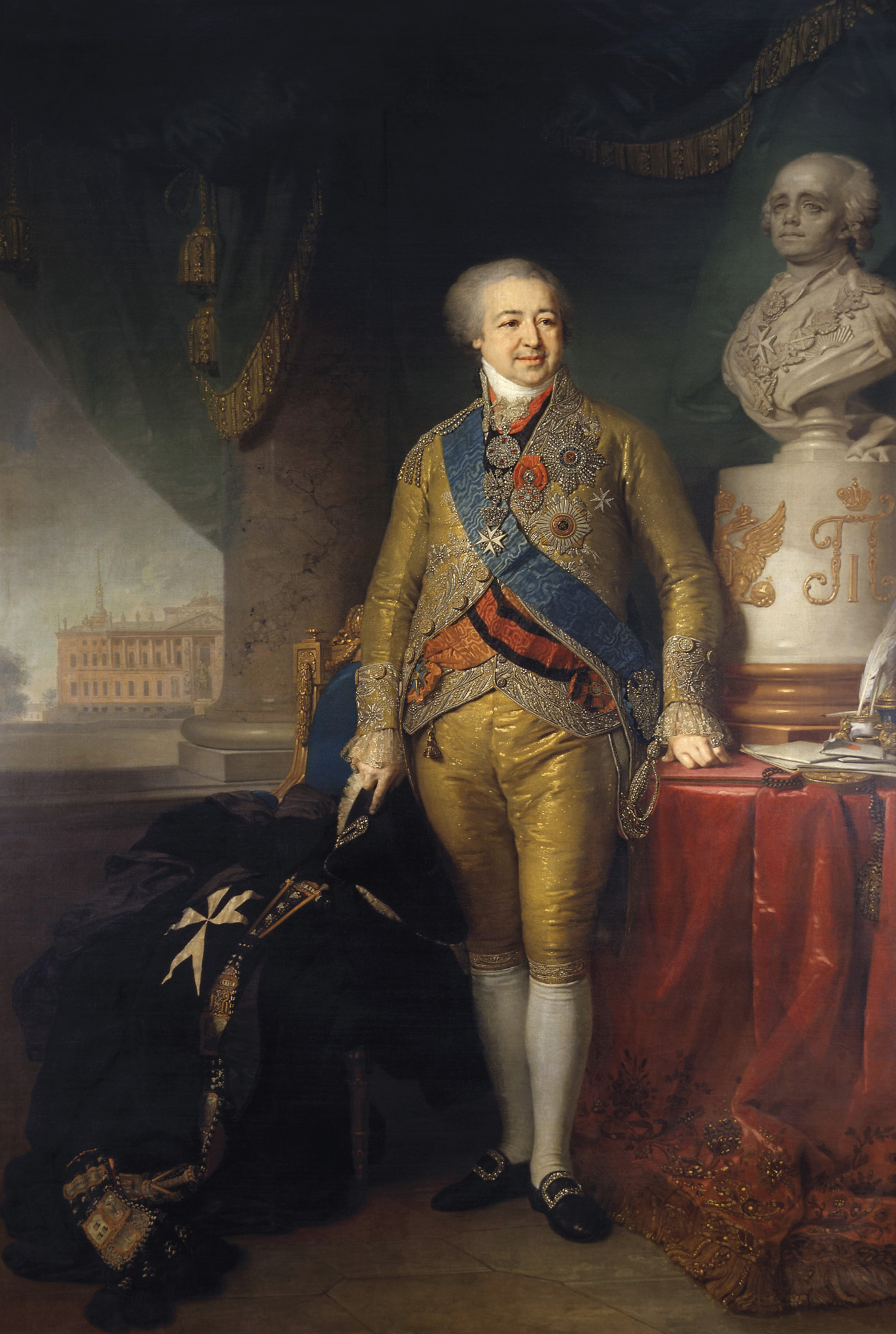
Portrait of Alexander Kurakin (1801-1802)

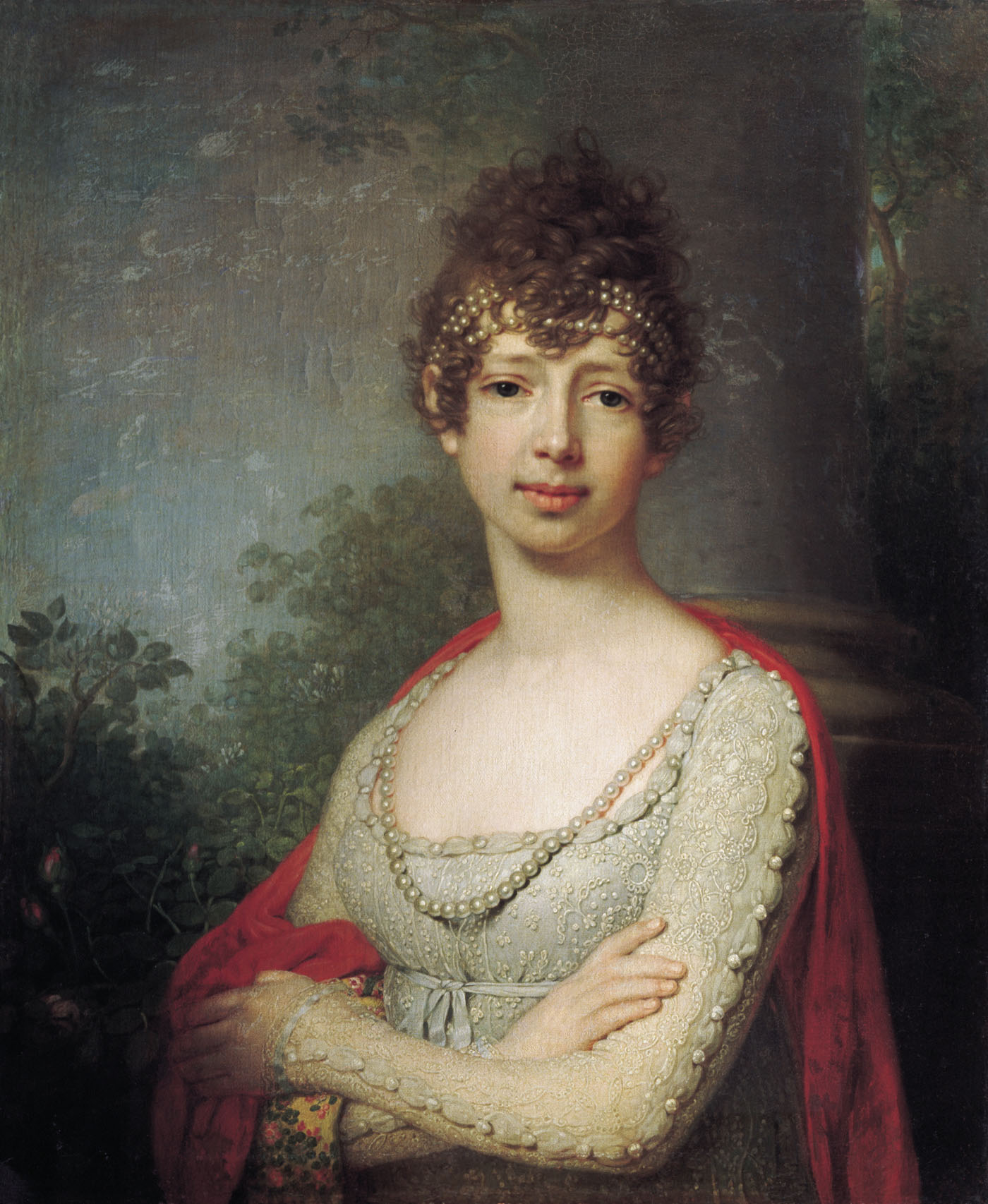
Portrait of Grand Duchess Maria Pavlovna of Russia (1800s)

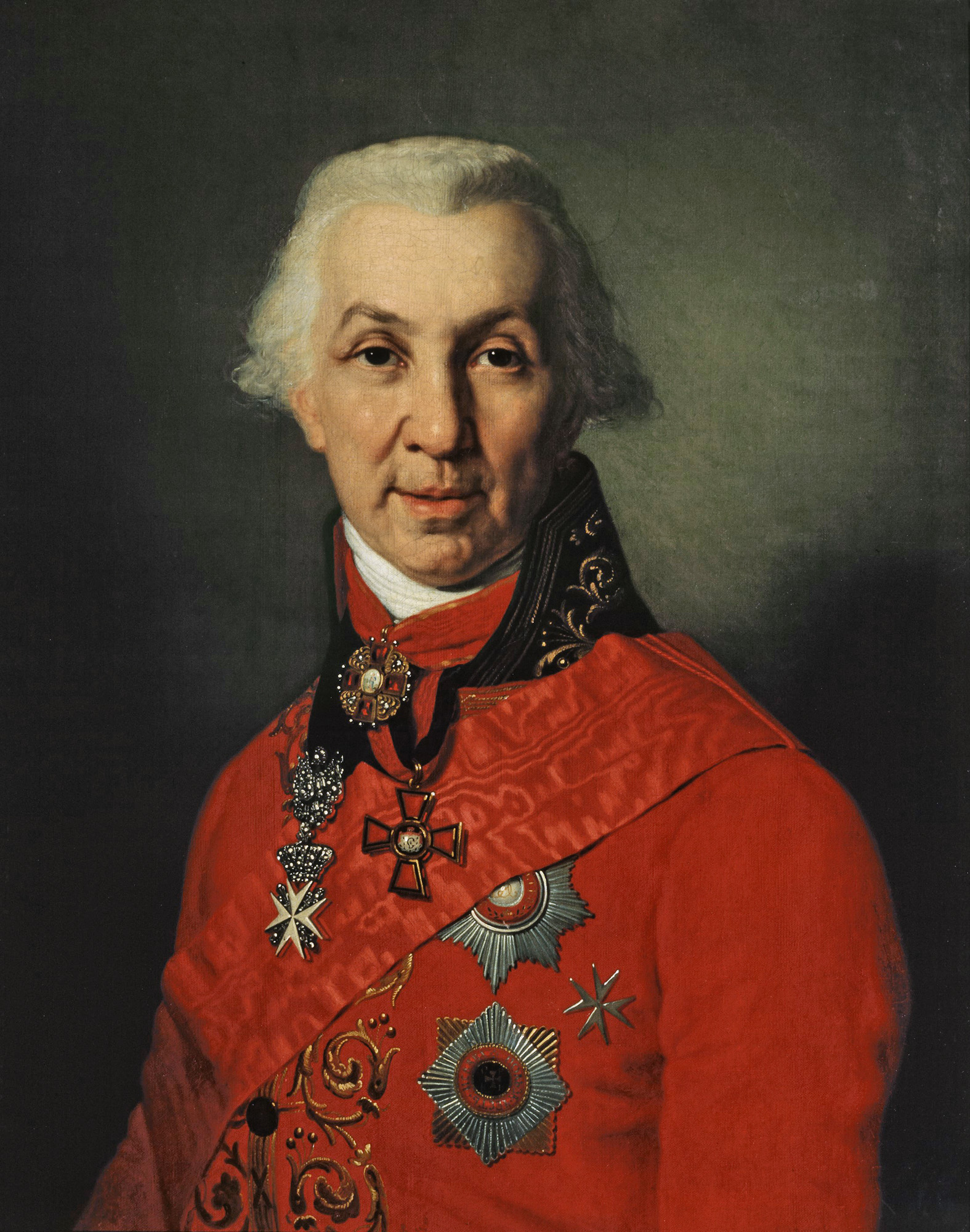
Portrait of Gavrila Romanovich Derzhavin (1811)

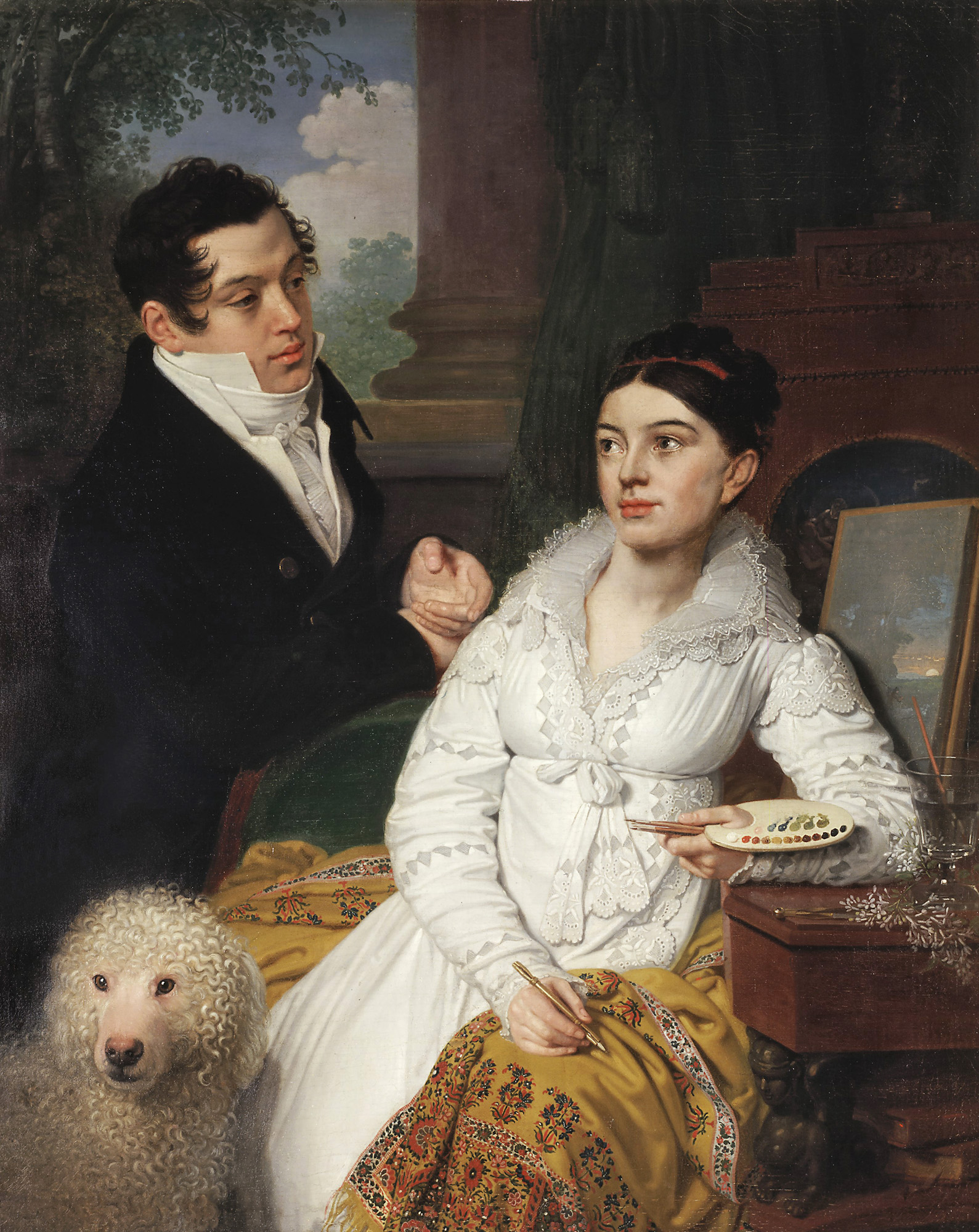
Portrait of A. G. and A. A. Lobanov-Rostovsky (1814)

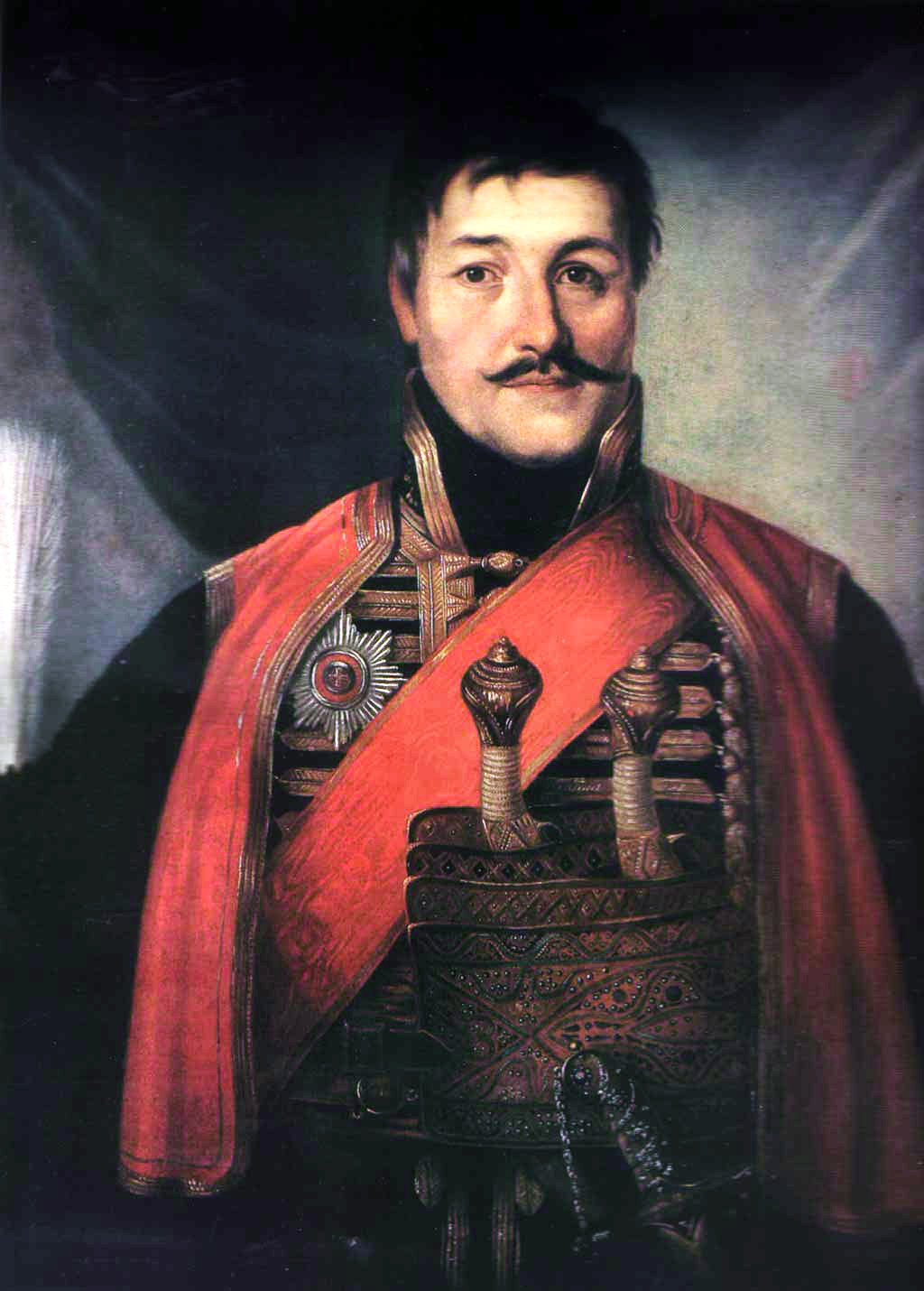
Karađorđe Serbian Prince (1816)

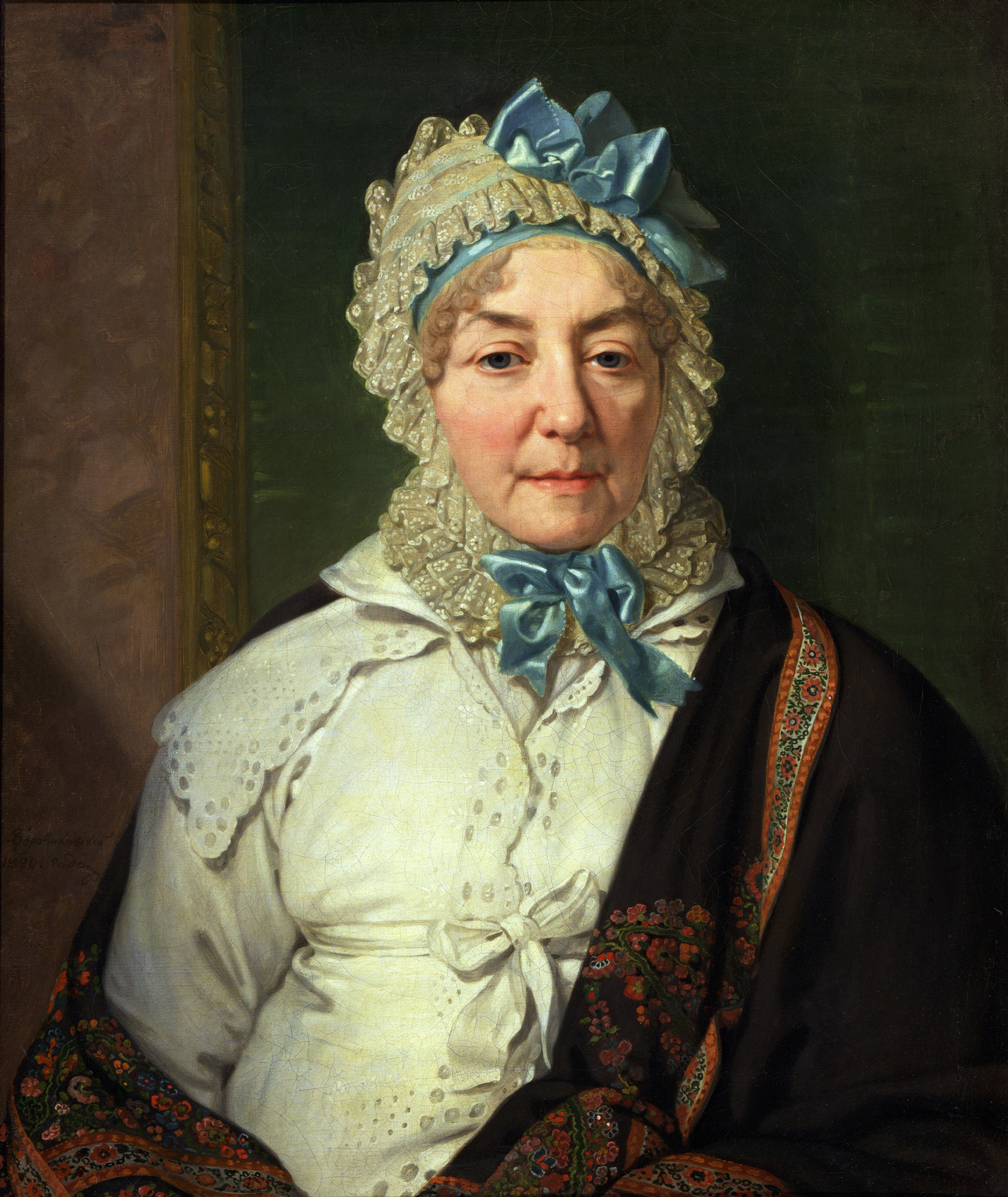
Portrait of Ye. A. Arkharova (1820)

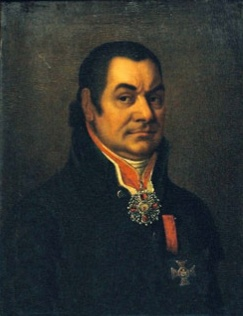
Portrait of Ioannis Varvakis

== Literature ==
- С. Н. Кондаков (1915). Юбилейный справочник Императорской Академии художеств. 1764-1914 (in Russian). Vol. 2. pp. 21–22.

== See also ==
- List of Russian artists
