= Ariel D. Procaccia =

Computer scientist

- אריאל פרוקצ'ה
- Education: Hebrew University of Jerusalem
- Awards: IJCAI Computers and Thought Award (2015); Guggenheim Fellowship (2018); Social Choice and Welfare Prize (2020); Kalai Prize (2024)
- Scientific career
- Fields: Computer science
- Workplaces: Carnegie Mellon University; Harvard University
- Thesis: Computational Voting Theory: Of the Agents, By the Agents, For the Agents (2008)
- Doctoral advisor: Jeffrey S. Rosenschein
- Website: procaccia.info

Ariel D. Procaccia (Hebrew: אריאל פרוקצ'ה) is an Israeli-American computer scientist. He is Alfred and Rebecca Lin Professor of Computer Science at Harvard University. He was previously an associate professor of computer science at Carnegie Mellon University. He is known for his research in artificial intelligence (AI) and theoretical computer science, especially for his work on computational aspects of game theory, social choice, and fair division. He is the founder of Spliddit, a fair division website.

== Biography ==
Procaccia received his Ph.D., summa cum laude, in computer science from the Hebrew University of Jerusalem in 2009. His doctoral dissertation won the IFAAMAS Victor Lesser Distinguished Dissertation Award for the best dissertation in the area of autonomous agents and multi-agent systems. Subsequently, he was a postdoctoral researcher at Microsoft and Harvard University, where he was partially supported by a Rothschild Fellowship from Yad Hanadiv. In 2011, he joined the Computer Science Department at Carnegie Mellon University as a faculty member. In spring 2020 he was on sabbatical at Carnegie Mellon University, where he was a faculty member until 2019. In 2020, he moved to Harvard as a Gordon McKay Professor of Computer Science.

== Research and awards ==
In 2015, Procaccia won the IJCAI Computers and Thought Award, given every two years since 1971 to an outstanding AI researcher under the age of 35, for "his contributions to the fields of computational social choice and computational economics, and for efforts to make advanced fair division techniques more widely accessible". He is a recipient of a 2015 Sloan Research Fellowship, a 2018 Guggenheim Fellowship, the 2020 Social Choice and Welfare Prize, the 2024 Kalai Prize, and the 2024 ACM SIGecom Mid-Career Award. He was elected an AAAI Fellow in 2024 and an ACM Fellow in 2026.

== Misc ==
Procaccia is an emeritus blogger on the popular algorithmic game theory blog "Turing's Invisible Hand."
