= Yannis Smaragdis =

Greek film director (born 1946)

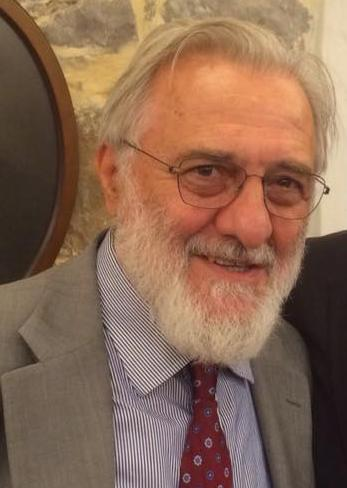
- Smaragdis in 2014
- Born: 25 April 1946 (age 80); Heraklion, Crete, Greece
- Occupations: Film director, screenwriter, academician
- Years active: 1972–present

Yannis Smaragdis (Greek: Γιάννης Σμαραγδής) is a Greek film director. In October 2024, he was the first Greek director elected as a regular member of the European Academy of Sciences and Arts.

== Biography ==
He was born in Heraklion, Crete in 1946 and studied film in Greece and Paris, France. He appeared in 1972 with his short film Two Three Things... which received the first prize in the Athens Festival and received recognition at the Montreal Film Festival in Canada. Yannis Smaragdis has taught Mass Media courses at the Panteion University of Athens, as well as film direction and screenwriting at film schools in Greece. He has published 2 books: Poetic Geography (1995) and Cavafy (1997) - a literary form of the script of the film Cavafy. Yannis Smaragdis is an honorary member of the Directors Guild of America.

== Films ==
=== Two Three Things (1972) ===
Short film.

- First prize at the Athens Film Festival

=== Zero Cell (1975) ===
Feature film.

- Honorable Mention at the Thessaloniki Film Festival.
- Nominated for Best Director at the Karlovy Vary International Film Festival.

=== A Good Night to You, Mr Alexandre (1981) ===
A tribute to the life and work of Greek author Alexandros Papadiamantis.

=== Alaloum (1982) ===
Feature film. Box office record.

=== Homecoming Song (1983) ===
Feature film.

- State award for Best Feature.
- Nominated for a Golden Prize at the Moscow International Film Festival.

=== Cavafy (1996) ===
Cavafy, released in 1996, is a biopic of Greek poet Constantine P. Cavafy. Originally titled Kavafis, it stars Dimitris Katalifos and its film score was created by Vangelis. It is a feature film 95 minutes in length. Accolades for the film include:

- Five state awards (including Best Feature Film, Best Director) (Thessaloniki Film Festival)
- Two international awards for the score by Vangelis: the Georges Delerue Award for Best Soundtrack/Sound Design at the 1997 Film Fest Gent, Belgium, and best soundtrack at Valencia International Film Festival in Valencia, Spain
- Nominated for a Grand Prix at the Flanders International Film Festival
- Nominated for a Golden Astor at the Mar del Plata International Film Festival
- Official participation at many international film festivals, including Toronto, Berlin, London, São Paulo, Mar del Plata, Brisbane, Jerusalem, and Stockholm
- Greek nomination for the 1997 European Film Awards

=== Spyros Louis (2004) ===
A tribute to the first Greek modern Olympic Winner, Marathon runner Spyros Louis (60 minutes).

- First International Award "Guirlande d' Honneur 2004" at SPORTS MOVIES Festival in Milan, Italy.

=== El Greco (2007) ===
Biopic of the artist El Greco. Feature film based on a fictional story, international co-production.

- 8 State awards for 2007 (including Best Feature film, Best Direction)
- Audience Award for Best Feature Film during the 48th International Film Festival in Thessaloniki and *Awarded for Best Feature Film from the Greek Union of Film Television and Audiovisual Technicians.
- First of the five golden films by CBC at the 2008 Toronto Film Festival.
- First Prize for actor Juan Diego Botto at the 2008 Cairo International Film Festival. *International GOYA award in 2009 (Spanish Academy of Cinematic Art and Science) for costume designer Lala Huete.
- Official selection at the International Film Festival of: Toronto 2008, São Paulo 2008, European Film Festival 2008 of the American Film Institute in Washington, Cairo 2008, Guadalajara International Festival 2009, Pantalla Pinamar in Argentina, and more other.

=== God Loves Caviar (2012) ===
Biopic of pirate turned business tycoon Ioannis Varvakis. The feature film is known in Greek as O Theos agapaei to haviari. international co-production. The Toronto Globe and Mail called it "laughably bad".

- Official participation at the Toronto International Film Festival 2012, Shanghai International Film Festival 2013.

=== Kazantzakis (2017) ===
Biopic of writer Nikos Kazantzakis.

=== The Governor (2025) ===
The director is preparing a national film on the life and work of the great Greek politician and visionary, Ioannis Kapodistrias. Even before the filming began, Giannis Smaragdis was awarded the 1st International Ioannis Kapodistrias Award by the Academy of Greek Art Awards.

== Other activities ==
Smaragdis has taught Mass Media courses at the Panteion University of Athens, as well as film direction and screenwriting at various film schools in Greece. He has published 2 books: «Poetic Geography», 1995 and «CAVAFY», 1997 - a literary form of the script of «Cavafy», the film.

== Awards ==
- Was voted on the Greek web the most popular artist in Greece for the year 2012
- Honored by the students of the 1st Vocational High School in Argos, who inaugurated their new studio "Image and Sound Studio Yannis Smaragdis" in 2013.
- Excellence Award from the European Council for Youth Mobility in Research and Technology during the event "Excellence Awards, Greeks who are Role Models for the New Generation" in 2010
- Honorary Member of the Giuseppe Sciacca International Awards Committee 2012.
- Appointed Director of Cinema and Theatre and Head of all scientific research of the relative department by the Istituto di Studi Giuridici Economici e Sociali Internazionali I.S.G.E.S.I. 2013
- Wisdom Award (Vraveion Sophiis) from the National and Kapodistrian University of Athens for his film EL GRECO, in Delphi, Greece. Summer 2008
- International Award for the Best Director in the world "GIUSEPPE SCIACCA 2008", in Rome – Italy
- The Euro - American Women's Council's Award in Santa Barbara, California 2008
- Artemis International Award by the European - American women Council 2008
- Honorary Award at the Maremetraggio Film Festival in Trieste, Italy 2008
- Voted Director of the Year in STATUS Magazine in 2008
- Smaragdis is an honorary member of the Directors' Guild of America.

== Screenwriter ==
- 1972: 1972: TWO THREE THINGS..., Short film.
- 1975: ZERO CELL - Feature film.
- 1981: A GOOD NIGHT TO YOU, MR. ALEXANDRE ... - A tribute to the life and work of Greek author Alexandros Papadiamantis. (60’).
- 1983: HOMECOMING SONG - Feature film. 90’.
- 1996: CAVAFY – Feature film. 85΄
- 2004: SPYROS LOUIS – a tribute to the first Greek modern Olympic Winner, Marathon runner Spyros Louis 60'
- 2007: EL GRECO –Feature film 112’.
- 2012: GOD LOVES CAVIAR- Feature film 101’.
- 2017: NIKOS KAZANTZAKIS - Feature film

== Television ==
- 1985: HADJIMANUEL - TV series. Five episodes (60').
- 1987: AVE TASO KARATASSO - TV series. Thirteen episodes (45' minutes each).
    - Nominated for best director at the Prague TV Festival 1989.
- 1988: HUSH... OUR COUNTRY IS SLEEPING - Television series. Thirteen episodes (45' minutes each).
- 2001: LES ENFANTS GATES - TV series. Eighteen episodes (32' minutes each) for the Greek Television ET1.

== Documentaries ==
- 1978: VERGINA 1978 AD - For the Greek National TV
- 1979: CHRISTMAS AT VOIO – For the Greek National TV
- 1980: BUILDERS AND PELIKANS - For the Greek National TV
- 1980: A WEDDNING AT VELVENDO - For the Greek National TV
- 1981: CYCLOPS' CAVE – For the Greek National TV
- 1981: THE PEOPLE UNDER THE WALLS - For the Greek National TV
- 1984: THE AEGEAN: FROM HOMER TO ELYTIS - A documentary on the space and discourse of Greece.
- 1986: SMILING ON THE WAY - Eight documentaries, 30 minutes each. For the Greek National TV
  - TV award Best Photography (Nikos Smaragdis)
- 1990-1993: THUS SPAKE THE CITY - Thirteen film essays (30'). Poets and Cities. For the Greek National TV.
- 1996: TRADITIONAL TANNERIES OF AMFISSA (30')
- 1998: "I'VE BROUGHT TO ART." - Forty episodes (5'minutes each) segments of cultural content for the Greek National TV.
- 2004: CHRISTIAN MONUMENTS - a documentary about the Christian Monuments of Greece (50' minutes). For the Greek National TV
  - Official Participation at the Jihlava Documentary Film Festival 2010. For the Greek National TV
  - Official Participation at the 12th Thessaloniki Documentary Festival 2010.
- 2009: LOOKING FOR IOANNIS VARVAKIS - Documentary about Greek-Russian benefactor Ioannis Varvakis (45' minutes) for Greek National TV.

== Opera ==
- 1997: OPERA OF THE SHADOWS - opera, directed by Yannis Smaragdis. Performed at the Athens Opera House.
