= Varvakeion High School =

Public model school in Greece

Coordinates: 38°00′04″N 23°45′59″E

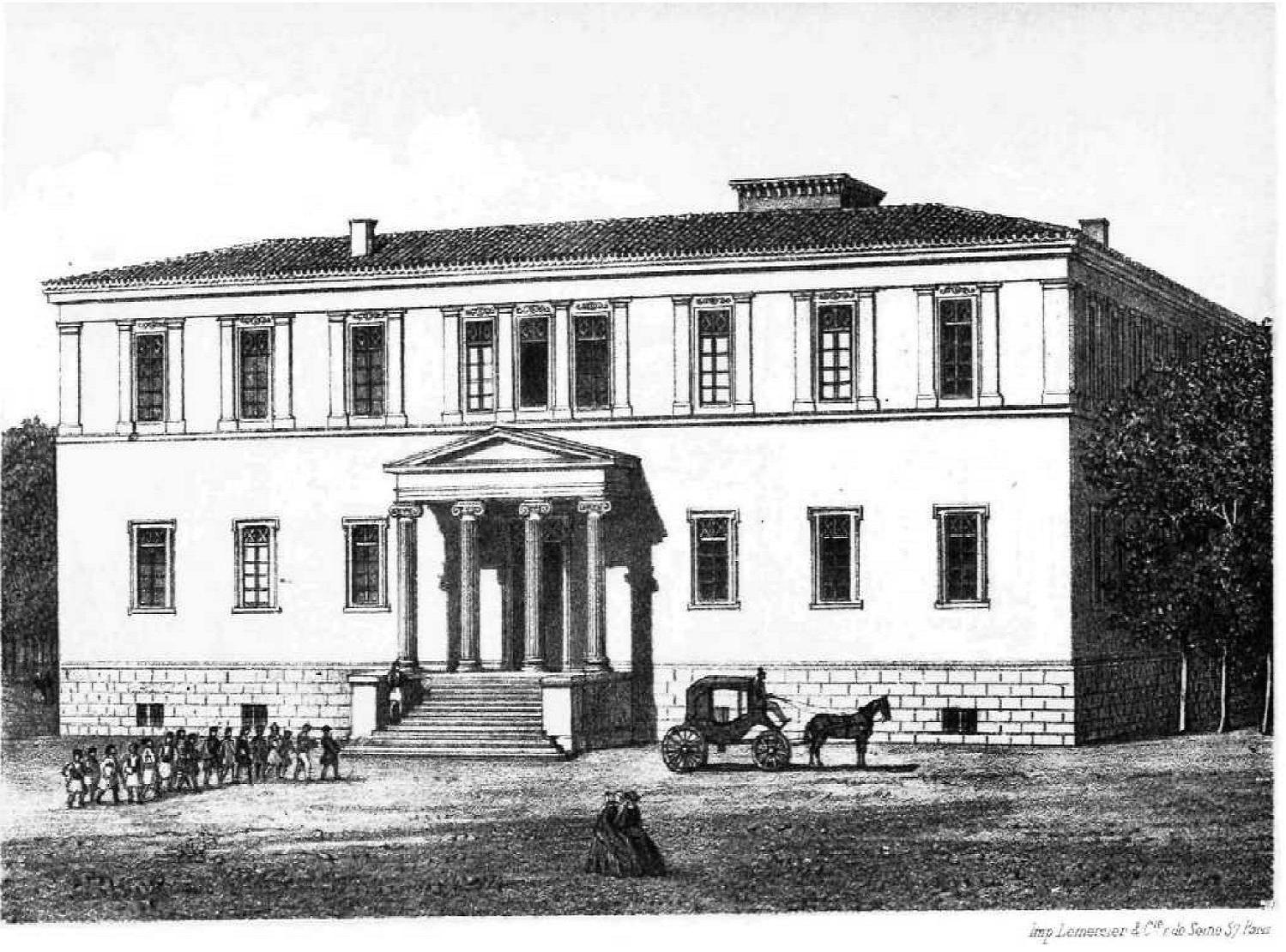
- The Varvakeion school in 1867
- Psychiko, Athens; Greece

Information
- Type: Public Model (Πρότυπο) High School
- Established: 1860
- Founder: Ioannis Varvakis

The Varvakeion High School (Greek: Πρότυπο Γυμνάσιο & ΓΕ.Λ. Βαρβακείου Σχολής) is a public Greek junior high school and high school located in Psychiko.

== History ==
Varvakeion was founded by Ioannis Varvakis, who donated a big part of his fortune to the state, in order to build a public, fee-less high school. The realization of Varvakis' dream came true after his death as the building was opened in 1860, initially across from the present-day Varvakios Agora (central market). Badly damaged in the civil war, the original Panagis Kalkos-designed building was demolished in 1955 or 1956. The school moved several times before settling on its current location in Psychiko in 1983. Originally all-male, the school became co-ed in 1979. Today, the school is recognized as one of the leading Model Schools (Πρότυπα Σχολεία) in Greece. Admission is highly competitive and determined through entrance examinations.

== Notable alumni ==
The Varvakeion High School has produced, over the years, notable alumni in varied fields. Some of them include:

=== Arts and literature ===
- Freddy Germanos, actor
- Georgios Drosinis, poet
- Dimitri Mitropoulos, composer and pianist
- Alexandros Papadiamantis, novelist and poet
- Antonis Samarakis, writer
Prominent figures who attended the Varvakeion High School

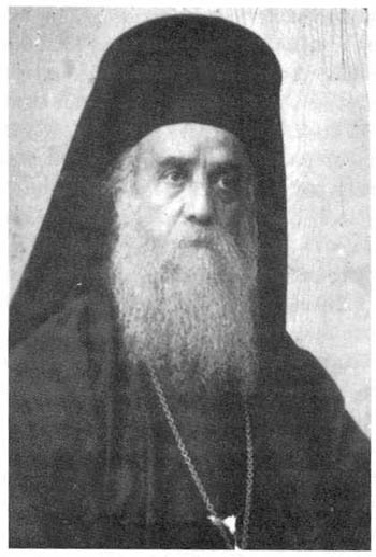
Saint Nectarios

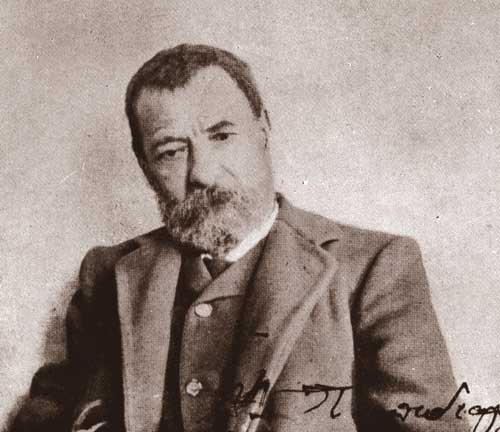
Alexandros Papadiamantis

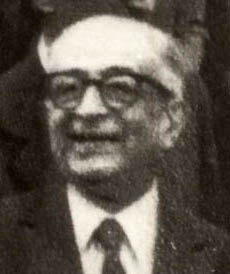
Konstantinos Tsatsos

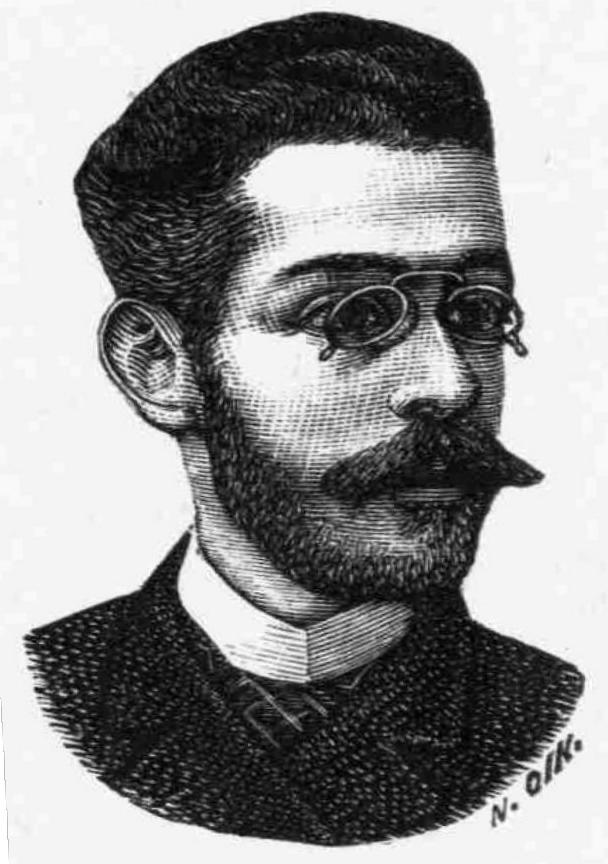
Georgios Drosinis

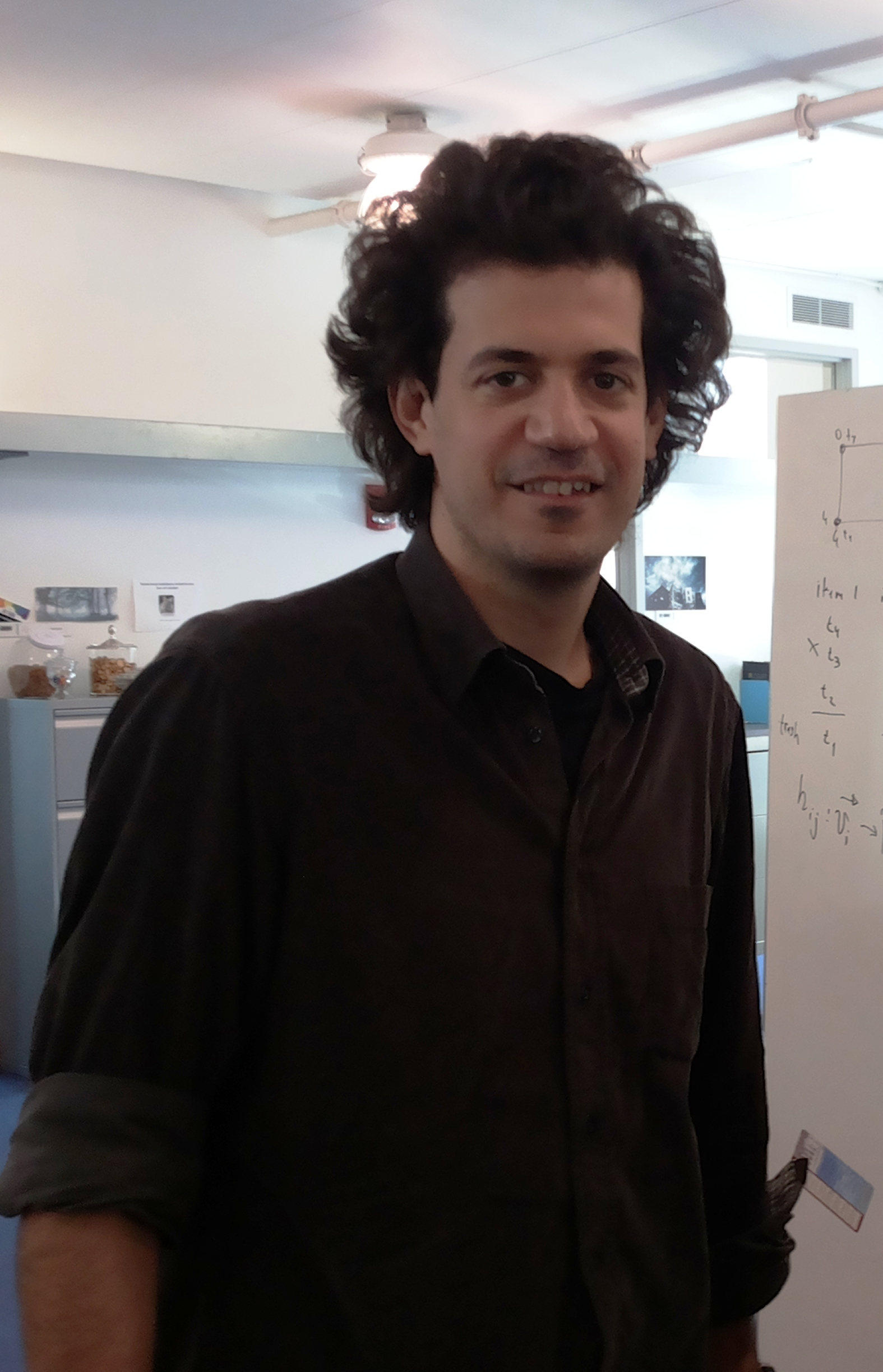
Constantinos Daskalakis

=== Economics and politics ===
- Evangelos Averoff, former President of New Democracy party and Minister
- Leonidas Kouris, former Mayor of Athens
- Theodoros Pangalos, politician, Deputy Prime Minister of Greece
- Alexandros Papagos, former Prime Minister of Greece
- Dimitrios Papadimoulis, former Vice-President of the European Parliament
- Yiangos Pesmazoglou, former economist, Member of the Hellenic Parliament and MEP
- Konstantinos Tsatsos, former diplomat and President of the Hellenic Republic
- Nikolaos Vettas, AUEB professor of Economics

=== Science ===
- Constantinos Daskalakis, MIT professor of computer science (1999 alumnus)
- Constantinos Apostolou Doxiadis, architect
- Christos Papakyriakopoulos, mathematician
- Christos Papadimitriou, Columbia University professor of computer science
- Mihalis Yannakakis, Columbia University professor of computer science

=== Other ===
- Kostas Axelos, philosopher
- Saint Nectarios of Aegina

== See also ==
- Varvakeion Athena, a statue found near the original (demolished) site of the school
