= Chvátal =

Chvátal (Czech pronunciation: [ˈxvaːtal]; feminine: Chvátalová) is a Czech and Slovak surname, meaning '[he] rushed'. Notable people with the surname include:

- Janet Chvatal (born 1964), American classical singer, author and producer
- Juraj Chvátal (born 1996), Slovak footballer
- Martin Ferdinand Quadal, born Chvátal (1736–1811), Czech-Austrian painter
- Václav Chvátal (born 1946), Czech-Canadian mathematician

== See also ==
- Chvátal graph, named after Václav Chvátal
- Chvátal–Sankoff constants, named after Václav Chvátal
- Franz Xaver Chwatal (1808–1879), Czech composer and music educator
