= Minimum bounding circle =

Minimum bounding circle may refer to:

- Bounding sphere
- Smallest circle problem
