= Gamma =

Third letter of the Greek alphabet

Gamma (/ˈɡæmə/; uppercase Γ, lowercase γ; Greek: γάμμα, romanized: gámma) is the third letter of the Greek alphabet. In the system of Greek numerals it has a value of 3. In Ancient Greek, the letter gamma represented a voiced velar stop IPA: [ɡ]. In Modern Greek, this letter normally represents a voiced velar fricative IPA: [ɣ], except before either of the two front vowels (/e/, /i/), where it represents a voiced palatal fricative IPA: [ʝ]; while /g/ in foreign words is instead commonly transcribed as γκ).

In the International Phonetic Alphabet and other modern Latin-alphabet based phonetic notations, it represents the voiced velar fricative.

== History ==
The Greek letter Gamma Γ is a grapheme derived from the Phoenician letter 𐤂 (gīml) which was rotated from the right-to-left script of Canaanite to accommodate the Greek language's writing system of left-to-right. The Canaanite grapheme represented the /g/ phoneme in the Canaanite language, and as such is cognate with gimel ג of the Hebrew alphabet.

Based on its name, the letter has been interpreted as an abstract representation of a camel's neck, but this has been criticized as contrived, and it is more likely that the letter is derived from an Egyptian hieroglyph representing a club or throwing stick.

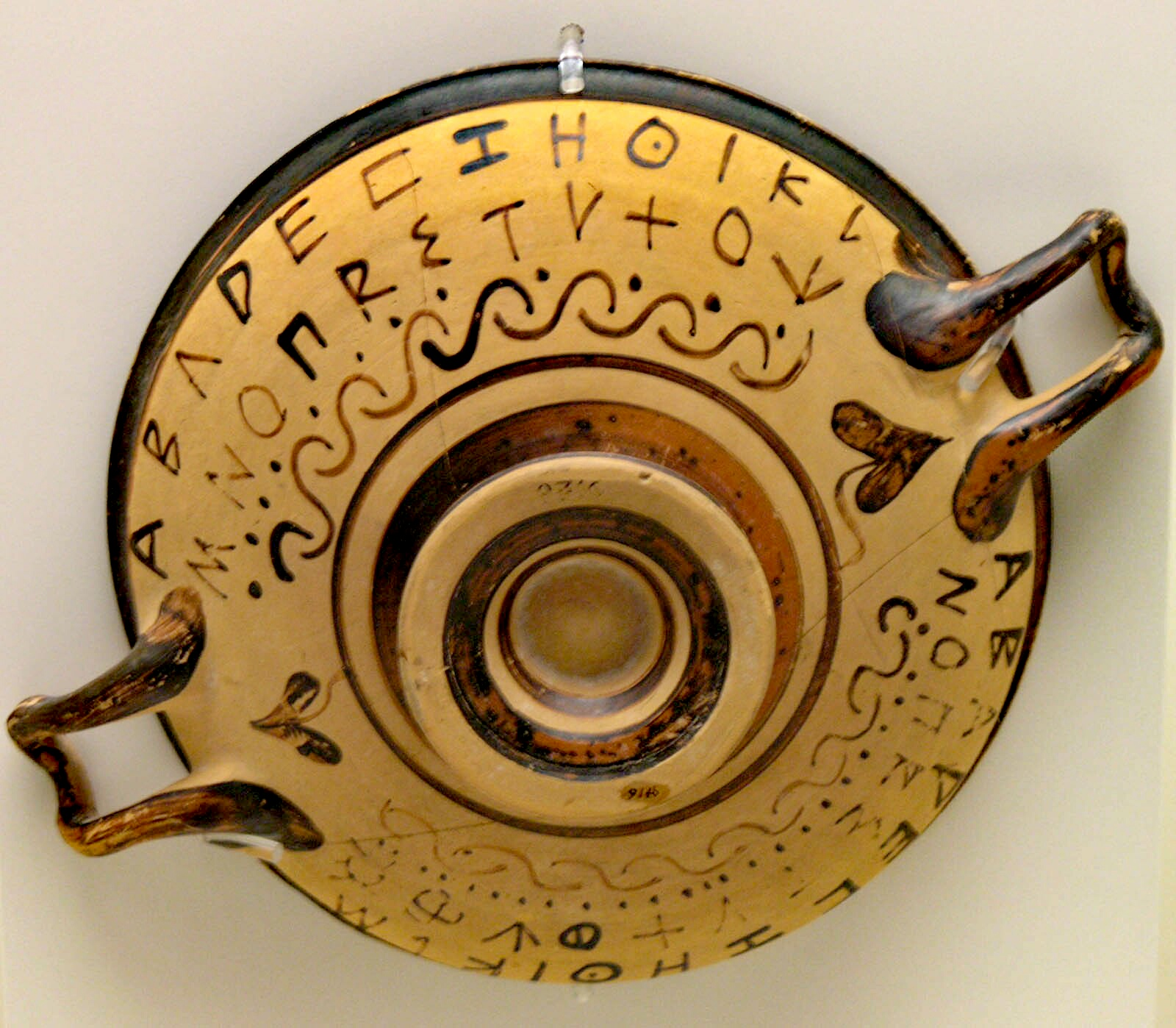
The alphabet on black-figure pottery with a lambda-shaped gamma

In Archaic Greece, the shape of gamma was closer to a classical lambda (Λ), while lambda retained the Phoenician L-shape (𐌋).

Letters that arose from the Greek gamma include Etruscan (Old Italic) 𐌂, Roman C and G, Runic kaunan ᚲ, Gothic geuua 𐌲, the Coptic Ⲅ, and the Cyrillic letters Г and Ґ.

== Greek phoneme ==
The Ancient Greek /g/ phoneme was the voiced velar stop, continuing the reconstructed proto-Indo-European *g, *ǵ.

The modern Greek phoneme represented by gamma is realized either as a voiced palatal fricative (/ʝ/) before a front vowel (/e/, /i/), or as a voiced velar fricative /ɣ/ in all other environments. Both in Ancient and in Modern Greek, before other velar consonants (κ, χ, ξ – that is, k, kh, ks), gamma represents a velar nasal /ŋ/. A double gamma γγ (e.g., άγγελος, "angel") represents the sequence /ŋɡ/ (phonetically varying [ŋɡ~ɡ]) or /ŋɣ/.

== Phonetic transcription ==
Lowercase Greek gamma is used in the Americanist phonetic notation and Uralic Phonetic Alphabet to indicate voiced consonants.

The gamma was also added to the Latin alphabet, as Latin gamma, in the following forms: majuscule Ɣ, minuscule ɣ, and superscript modifier letter ˠ.

In the International Phonetic Alphabet the minuscule letter is used to represent a voiced velar fricative and the superscript modifier letter is used to represent velarization. It is not to be confused with the character ɤ, which looks like a lowercase Latin gamma that lies above the baseline rather than crossing, and which represents the close-mid back unrounded vowel.

It is as a full-fledged majuscule and minuscule letter in the alphabets of some of languages of Africa such as Dagbani, Dinka, Kabye, and Ewe, and Berber languages using the Berber Latin alphabet.

It is sometimes also used in the romanization of Pashto.

== Mathematics and science ==
=== Lowercase ===
The lowercase letter $\gamma$ is used as a symbol for:

- Gamma radiation in nuclear physics
- Shear strain in physics
- Surface tension in physics
- The photon, the elementary particle of light and other electromagnetic radiation
- The 434 nm spectral line in the Balmer series
- Surface energy in materials science
- The Lorentz factor in the theory of relativity
- In mathematics, the lower incomplete gamma function
- The heat capacity ratio C_{p} /C_{v} in thermodynamics
- The activity coefficient in thermodynamics
- The gyromagnetic ratio in electromagnetism
- Gamma waves in neuroscience
- Gamma motor neurons in neuroscience
- A non-SI metric unit of measure of mass equal to one microgram (1 μg). This always-rare use is deprecated.
- A non-SI unit of measure of magnetic flux density, sometimes used in geophysics, equal to 10^{−5} gauss (G), or 1 nanotesla (nT).
- The power by which the luminance of an image is increased in gamma correction
- In civil and mechanical engineering:
  - Specific weight
  - The shear rate of a fluid is represented by a lowercase gamma with a dot above it: $\dot \gamma$
  - Austenite (also known as γ-iron), a metallic non-magnetic allotrope or solid solution of iron.
- The gamma carbon, the third carbon attached to a functional group in organic chemistry and biochemistry; see Alpha and beta carbon
- Hermite constant
- The Euler’s Constant also known as Euler–Mascheroni constant ≈ 0.57721566490153286
- Stieltjes constants
- Chvátal–Sankoff constants

The lowercase Latin gamma ɣ can also be used in contexts (such as chemical or molecule nomenclature) where gamma must not be confused with the letter y, which can occur in some computer typefaces.

=== Uppercase ===
The uppercase letter $\Gamma$ is used as a symbol for:

- In mathematics, the gamma function (usually written as $\Gamma$-function) is an extension of the factorial to complex numbers
- In mathematics, the upper incomplete gamma function
- The Christoffel symbols in differential geometry
- In probability theory and statistics, the gamma distribution is a two-parameter family of continuous probability distributions.
- In solid-state physics, the center of the Brillouin zone
- In NMR and quantum information science, relaxation rates of a two-state quantum system or a quantum bit
- Circulation in fluid mechanics
- As reflection coefficient in physics and electrical engineering
- The tape alphabet of a Turing machine
- The Feferman–Schütte ordinal $\Gamma_0$
- Congruence subgroups of the modular group of other arithmetic groups
- One of the Greeks in mathematical finance

== Music ==
In Medieval music theory, Gamma was the starting note of the musical scale using the Guidonian hand. Paired with the Solfège syllable ut, it became the origin for the word "gamut" ("Gamma ut").

== Unicode ==
- U+0194 Ɣ LATIN CAPITAL LETTER GAMMA
- U+0263 ɣ LATIN SMALL LETTER GAMMA
- U+0264 ɤ LATIN SMALL LETTER RAMS HORN
- U+02E0 ˠ MODIFIER LETTER SMALL GAMMA
- U+0393 Γ GREEK CAPITAL LETTER GAMMA (&Gamma;)
- U+03B3 γ GREEK SMALL LETTER GAMMA (&gamma;)
- U+1D26 ᴦ GREEK LETTER SMALL CAPITAL GAMMA
- U+1D5E ᵞ MODIFIER LETTER SMALL GREEK GAMMA
- U+1D67 ᵧ GREEK SUBSCRIPT SMALL LETTER GAMMA
- U+213D ℽ DOUBLE-STRUCK SMALL GAMMA
- U+213E ℾ DOUBLE-STRUCK CAPITAL GAMMA
- U+2C84 Ⲅ COPTIC CAPITAL LETTER GAMMA
- U+2C85 ⲅ COPTIC SMALL LETTER GAMMA
- U+1D6AA 𝚪 MATHEMATICAL BOLD CAPITAL GAMMA (Note: The mathematical symbols should only be used in mathematics. Stylized Greek text should be encoded using the normal Greek letters, with markup and formatting to indicate text style.)
- U+1D6C4 𝛄 MATHEMATICAL BOLD SMALL GAMMA
- U+1D6E4 𝛤 MATHEMATICAL ITALIC CAPITAL GAMMA
- U+1D6FE 𝛾 MATHEMATICAL ITALIC SMALL GAMMA
- U+1D71E 𝜞 MATHEMATICAL BOLD ITALIC CAPITAL GAMMA
- U+1D738 𝜸 MATHEMATICAL BOLD ITALIC SMALL GAMMA
- U+1D758 𝝘 MATHEMATICAL SANS-SERIF BOLD CAPITAL GAMMA
- U+1D772 𝝲 MATHEMATICAL SANS-SERIF BOLD SMALL GAMMA
- U+1D792 𝞒 MATHEMATICAL SANS-SERIF BOLD ITALIC CAPITAL GAMMA
- U+1D7AC 𝞬 MATHEMATICAL SANS-SERIF BOLD ITALIC SMALL GAMMA

== See also ==
- Г, г - Ge (Cyrillic)
- C, c - Latin
- G, g - Latin
- Gamma correction
- List of storms named Gamma
