= Sbihi =

Sbihi is a Moroccan surname. Notable people with the surname include:

- Moe Sbihi (born 1988), British rower
- Mohamed Amine Sbihi (born 1954), Moroccan politician
- Najiba Sbihi (born 1953), Moroccan mathematician
