= County collecting =

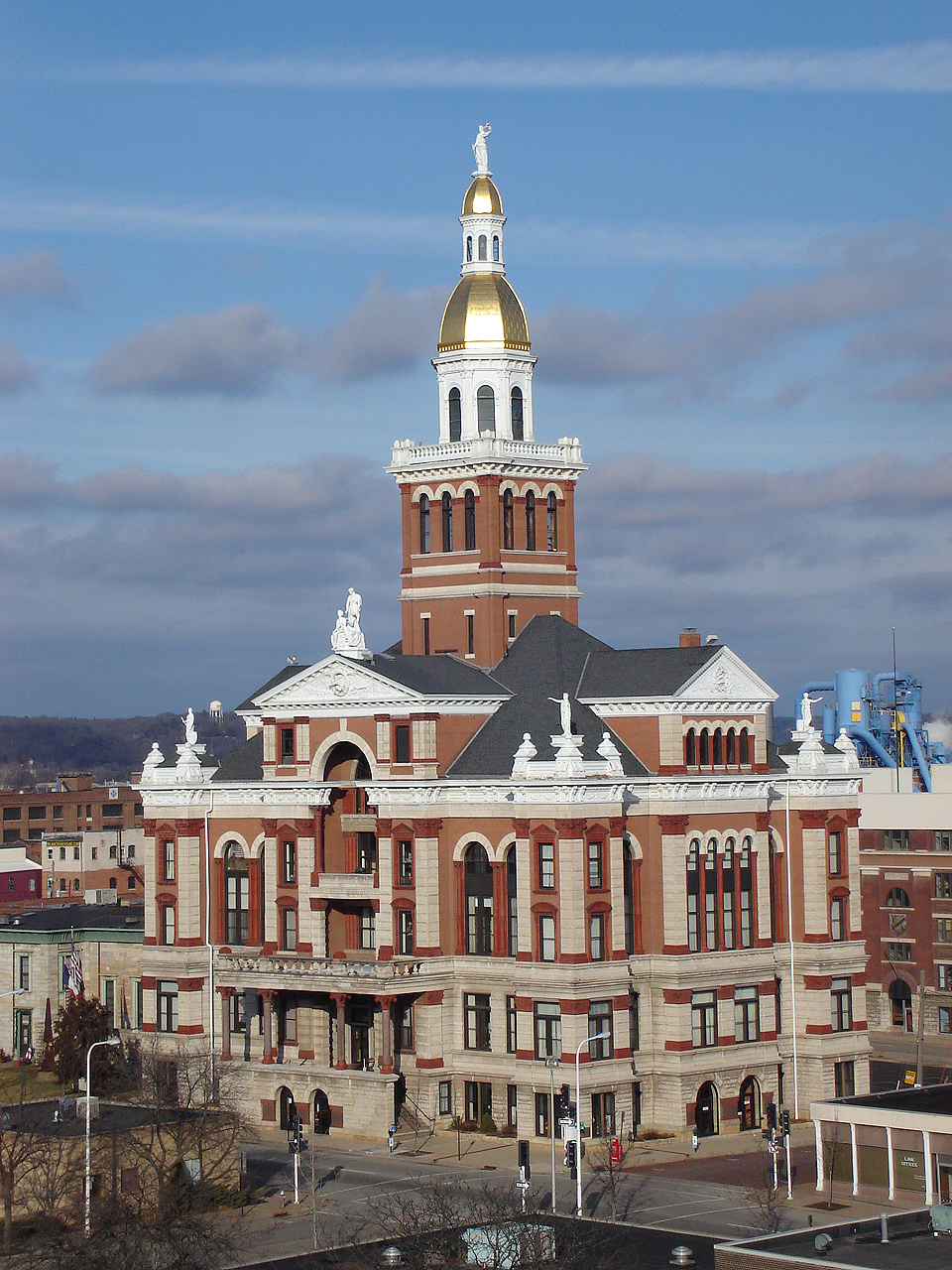
The courthouses for Dubuque County, Iowa

County collecting is keeping track of the counties and other major census divisions one has visited in the United States. Most county collectors keep track with the goal of visiting every county or county equivalent in the United States. Some try to complete or "black out" individual states, and others are only interested in keeping track of the counties they have visited without concern for which state it is in.

County collecting is a way for people to relate to geography and their own life histories and to travel the country away from main highways and tourist attractions. One journalist characterized it as "a very organized form of wanderlust." Many county collectors became interested in the pursuit after being given a school assignment to plot their travels on a county-outline map of the United States. Many county collectors document their travels by being photographed with a county sign marker, or by taking a photo of the sign itself. Some document these travels with gas and other receipts. However, the web sites and organized groups that facilitate county collecting do not require a participant to prove his or her entry into a particular county, on the reasoning that this is something that the collector does for themselves and their own fulfillment, rather than to compete with others.

The Extra Miler Club (EMC) was founded in 1973 by three county completionists who came up with the idea because they had been collecting license plates and noticed in their discussion how many rural counties they had all visited in that pursuit. The club is a non-profit organization that meets annually in conjunction with the Automobile License Plate Collectors Association and recognizes completers (of which there are now 66, as of 2022) on its web site. The club publishes a quarterly print newsletter.

As of August 2022, the county collecting web site mob-rule.com has 7725 registered users from all 50 states, 9 provinces of Canada, and 26 other foreign countries. The average number of visited counties is 585.

Some avid county collectors visit new counties by taking circuitous routes, for example, driving from Minneapolis to Chicago by way of Green Bay, Wisconsin. Many determined collectors take entire trips which consist of driving around states in cornrow patterns. However, taking a short detour from a direct route to visit one or more counties is called dipping. The circuitous routes and special trips needed to visit counties far removed from Interstates and other main roads is how The Extra Miler Club got its name.

Other county collectors choose to have higher standards than just being physically present on the ground in some part of the county. Some attempt to visit every county seat or county courthouse as a way to avoid only briefly dipping in a county. John Deacon is a lawyer who visited all county courthouses in the lower 48, he indexed these courthouses on his website courthouses.co. The late Bob LaBrash would only consider a county visited if he drove through it in his 1926 Ford Model A. More recently, some collectors use the geocaching system to determine and record their visits.

There are currently 3,144 counties and county-equivalents in the United States, including the boroughs and census areas of Alaska, the parishes of Louisiana, the planning regions of Connecticut, the independent cities of Baltimore, Maryland, St. Louis, Missouri, Carson City, Nevada, 38 cities in Virginia and Washington, D.C. There are also counties and county equivalents in the provinces of Canada from Ontario to Nova Scotia. Mathematician William J. Cook used the principles of the travelling salesman problem to calculate that the optimal route visiting every county's seat in the mainland United States would cover 93,466 miles (150,419 km), though he noted that county collectors typically travel a much longer distance.

Ken Jennings discussed the phenomenon and the Extra Miler Club in his 2012 book, Maphead: Charting the Wide, Weird World of Geography Wonks.

== In the news ==
- In 1991, Allen Zondlak of Michigan completed a 36-year quest to visit every county, finishing on Nantucket stating he wanted to save the best for last.
- In 2012, J. Stephen Conn of Tennessee finished a 17-year journey to visit every US county, covered in the Knoxville News Sentinel and the Chattanooga Times Free Press.
- In 2015, a couple from Hancock, Michigan, Jennifer and Jonathan Riehl, had visited every county in the Lower 48 with the same vehicle, a Dodge Intrepid; the story was covered nationally by NBC News. The couple finished the Lower 48 on Nantucket, and had plans to take their car to Hawaii to finish the country.
- In 2017, Hugh Steinhice of Tennessee, in conjunction with that year's total eclipse of the sun, recounted his story of visiting every US county, covered in the Chattanooga Times Free Press.
- In 2019, Hugh Donovan of New Hampshire visited every US county in eight months, covered in the Cincinnati Enquirer and WMUR-TV in Manchester, New Hampshire.
