= Nimrod Megiddo =

Israeli mathematician and computer scientist

- Born: נמרוד מגידו
- Education: Hebrew University of Jerusalem
- Known for: Prune and search
- Awards: Frederick W. Lanchester Prize (1992); John von Neumann Theory Prize (2014)
- Scientific career
- Fields: Operations research Algorithms; Complexity; Machine learning Game theory
- Workplaces: IBM Research; Stanford University
- Thesis: Compositions of Cooperative Games (1972)
- Doctoral advisor: Michael Maschler
- Doctoral students: Edith Cohen
- Website: theory.stanford.edu/~megiddo/bio.html

Nimrod Megiddo (Hebrew: נמרוד מגידו) is a mathematician and computer scientist. He is a research scientist at the IBM Almaden Research Center and Stanford University. His interests include combinatorial optimization, algorithm design and analysis, game theory, and machine learning. He was one of the first people to propose a solution to the bounding sphere and smallest-circle problem.

== Education ==
Megiddo received his PhD in mathematics from the Hebrew University of Jerusalem for research supervised by Michael Maschler.

== Career and research ==
In computational geometry, Megiddo is known for his prune and search and parametric search techniques both suggested in 1983 and used for various computational geometric optimization problems, in particular to solve the smallest-circle problem in linear time. His former doctoral students include Edith Cohen.

=== Awards and honours ===
Megiddo received the 1992 INFORMS Computing Society Prize, and was part of a group of researchers receiving the 1992 Frederick W. Lanchester Prize for their research on the linear complementarity problem, also including Masakazu Kojima, Shinji Mizuno, Toshihito Noma, and Akiko Yoshise. In 2009 he received the Institute for Operations Research and the Management Sciences (INFORMS) Fellows award for contributions to the theory and application of mathematical programming, including parametric searches, interior point methods, low dimension Linear Programming, probabilistic analysis of the simplex method and computational game theory. He was the 2014 recipient of the John von Neumann Theory Prize.
