= Akiko Yoshise =

Japanese operations researcher

Akiko Yoshise (Japanese: 吉瀬 章子, romanized: Yoshise Akiko, born 1962) is a Japanese operations researcher and a professor in the Graduate School of Systems and Information Engineering at the University of Tsukuba. Her research has focused on mathematical optimization and its applications in service science, management and engineering.

== Education and career ==
Yoshise studied industrial engineering and management at the Tokyo Institute of Technology, receiving a bachelor's degree in 1985, a master's degree in 1987, and a doctorate in 1990.

She became an assistant professor at the University of Tsukuba in 1991, and an associate professor in 1993. From 2007 to 2011 she was a professor in the university's Graduate School of Systems and Information Engineering, and since 2011 she has been a professor in its Faculty of Engineering, Information and Systems. From 2021 to 2024 she was dean of the Faculty of Engineering, Information and Systems.

== Recognition ==
Yoshise was a 1992 recipient of the INFORMS Computing Society Prize, and was part of a group of five researchers given the 1992 INFORMS Frederick W. Lanchester Prize for their "long-term research program aimed at establishing a theoretical foundation for primal-dual interior point methods for linear programming and its generalization to linear complementarity problems". The group also included Masakazu Kojima, Nimrod Megiddo, Shinji Mizuno, and Toshihito Noma.

She was a 2003 recipient of the Funai Information Technology Prize, and was named as a Fellow of the Operations Research Society of Japan in 2011.
