= Edith Cohen =

Computer scientist

- עידית כהן
- Born: May 21, 1966 (age 60)
- Education: Tel Aviv University; Stanford University (PhD)
- Awards: ACM Fellow (2017)
- Scientific career
- Fields: Algorithms; Networking; Data Mining; Optimization
- Workplaces: IBM Research - Almaden; Google Inc; Bell Labs
- Thesis: Combinatorial Algorithms for Optimization Problems (1992)
- Doctoral advisor: Andrew V. Goldberg
- Website: cohenwang.com/edith

Edith Cohen (Hebrew: עידית כהן; born May 21, 1966) is an Israeli and American computer scientist specializing in data mining and algorithms for big data. She is also known for her research on peer-to-peer networks. She works for Google in Mountain View, California, and as a visiting professor at Tel Aviv University in Israel.

== Education ==
Cohen is originally from Tel Aviv, where her father was a banker. She earned a bachelor's degree in 1985, and a master's degree in 1986 from Tel Aviv University; her master's thesis was supervised by Michael Tarsi. She moved to Stanford University for her doctoral studies, and completed her Ph.D. in 1991 with Andrew V. Goldberg as her doctoral advisor and Nimrod Megiddo as an unofficial mentor. Her dissertation was Combinatorial Algorithms for Optimization Problems.

== Career and research ==
Cohen was a student researcher at IBM Research - Almaden from 1987 to 1991, and a researcher at Bell Labs and its successor AT&T Labs from 1991 to 2012. In 2012, she became a visiting professor at Tel Aviv University, and began working for Microsoft Research, as a visitor for one year and then as a principal researcher. She has been associated with Google since 2015.

=== Awards and honors ===
Cohen won the William R. Bennett prize of the IEEE Communications Society in 2007 with David Applegate, for their work on robust network routing. She was elected an ACM Fellow in 2017 "for contributions to the design of efficient algorithms for networking and big data".
