= Edward H. Kaplan =

American academic

Edward H. Kaplan is the William N. and Marie A. Beach Professor of Operations Research at the Yale School of Management, Professor of Public Health at the Yale School of Medicine, and Professor of Engineering in the Yale School of Engineering and Applied Science.

He won the Lanchester Prize in 1994.

Kaplan was elected a member of the National Academy of Engineering in 2003 for the assessment of needle-exchange programs and for generally bringing engineering perspectives to the design of public health policies. He was also elected to the 2005 class of Fellows of the Institute for Operations Research and the Management Sciences.
