= Frederick W. Lanchester Prize =

Award

The Frederick W. Lanchester Prize is an Institute for Operations Research and the Management Sciences prize (U.S. $5,000 cash prize and medallion) given for the best contribution to operations research and the management sciences published in English. It is named after Frederick W. Lanchester.

== Past winners ==
Past winners of the prize are:

- 1954 Leslie C. Edie
- 1955 Georges Brigham
- 1956 Richard E. Zimmerman
- 1957 Maurice F. C . Allais, Clayton J. Thomas and Walter L. Deemer, Jr
- 1959 Robert E. Chandler, Robert Herman, Elliott Waters Montroll and Alec M. Lee
- 1960 Herman F. Karreman
- 1961 Elio M. Ventura
- 1962 Robert M. Oliver and Aryeh H. Samuel
- 1963 Paul C. Gilmore and Ralph E. Gomory
- 1964 Frederic M. Scherer
- 1965 Michel Balinski and Rufus Isaacs
- 1966 Stafford Beer
- 1967 Douglass J. Wilde and Charles S. Beightler
- 1968 Anthony V. Fiacco, Garth P. McCormick and Philip M. Morse
- 1969 Harvey M. Wagner
- 1971 Edward E. David, John G. Truxal and Emil J. Piel
- 1972 Richard C. Larson
- 1973 Herbert Scarf, Terje Hansen, Louis M. Goreux and Alan S. Manne
- 1974 Peter Kolesar and Warren E. Walker
- 1975 Lawrence D. Stone
- 1976 Ralph Keeney, Howard Raiffa and Leonard Kleinrock
- 1977 Richard Karp, Gérard P. Cornuéjols, Marshall L. Fisher and George Nemhauser
- 1979 Michael R. Garey and David S. Johnson
- 1980 David M. Eddy
- 1981 David Hopkins and William Massy
- 1982 Karl-Heinz Borgwardt
- 1983 Martin Shubik, Ellis L. Johnson, Manfred W. Padberg and Harlan Crowder
- 1984 Narendra Karmarkar and Robert Tarjan
- 1985 Michael Maltz
- 1986 Alexander Schrijver and Peter Whittle
- 1988 Robin Roundy
- 1989 Jean Walrand, George L. Nemhauser and Laurence A. Wolsey
- 1990 Alvin E. Roth and Marilda Sotomayor
- 1991 Frank P. Kelly
- 1992 Masakazu Kojima, Nimrod Megiddo, Shinji Mizuno, Toshihito Noma and Akiko Yoshise
- 1993 Thomas L. Magnanti, James B. Orlin and Ravindra K. Ahuja
- 1994 Edward Kaplan, Richard Cottle, Jong-Shi Pang and Richard Stone
- 1995 Robert J. Aumann, Michael B. Maschler, Martin L. Puterman, and Richard E. Stearns
- 1996 George Fishman
- 1997 R. Tyrrell Rockafellar and Roger J-B Wets
- 2000 Olvi Mangasarian
- 2001 J. Michael Harrison
- 2003 Nicholas Vieille and Ward Whitt
- 2004 Alexander Schrijver
- 2005 Kalyan T. Talluri and Garrett J. van Ryzin
- 2006 Paul Glasserman
- 2007 David L. Applegate, Robert E. Bixby, Vašek Chvátal, and William J. Cook
- 2008 Warren P. Adams and Hanif D. Sherali, and Lawrence M. Wein
- 2009 Not awarded
- 2010 Not awarded
- 2011 David Easley and Jon Kleinberg
- 2012 Not awarded
- 2013 David P. Williamson and David Shmoys
- 2014 Not awarded
- 2015 Michele Conforti, Giacomo Zambelli and Gérard P. Cornuéjols
- 2016 Not awarded
- 2017 Not awarded
- 2018 Not awarded
- 2019 Tim Roughgarden, Omar Besbes, Yonatan Gur, N. Bora Keskin and Assaf Zeevi
- 2020: Peyman Mohajerin Esfahani, Daniel Kuhn
- 2021: Dimitris Bertsimas, Jack Dunn
- 2022: Daniel Russo, Benjamin Van Roy, Yurii Nesterov
- 2023: Guanghui Lan, Rakesh V. Vohra
- 2024: Itai Ashlagi, Mark Braverman, Yash Kanoria, Jacob Leshno, Peng Shi, Anatoli Juditsky, Arkadi Nemirovski
- 2025: Boris Mordukhovich

== See also ==
- List of business and industry awards
- List of prizes named after people
