= Emo Welzl =

Computer scientist

Emmerich (Emo) Welzl (born 4 August 1958 in Linz, Austria) is a computer scientist known for his research in computational geometry. He is a professor in the Institute for Theoretical Computer Science at ETH Zurich in Switzerland.

== Biography ==
Welzl was born on 4 August 1958 in Linz, Austria. He studied at the Graz University of Technology receiving a Diplom in Applied Mathematics in 1981 and a doctorate in 1983 under the supervision of Hermann Maurer. Following postdoctoral studies at Leiden University, he became a professor at the Free University of Berlin in 1987 at age 28 and was the youngest professor in Germany. Since 1996 he has been professor of Computer Science at the ETH Zurich.

Welzl is a member of multiple journal editorial boards, and has been program chair for the Symposium on Computational Geometry in 1995, one of the tracks of the International Colloquium on Automata, Languages and Programming in 2000, and one of the tracks of the European Symposium on Algorithms in 2007.

== Research ==
Much of Welzl's research has been in computational geometry. With David Haussler, he showed that machinery from computational learning theory including ε-nets and VC dimension could be useful in geometric problems such as the development of space-efficient range searching data structures. He devised linear time randomized algorithms for the smallest circle problem and for low-dimensional linear programming, and developed the combinatorial framework of LP-type problems that generalizes both of these problems. Other highly cited research publications by Welzl and his co-authors describe algorithms for constructing visibility graphs and using them to find shortest paths among obstacles in the plane, test whether two point sets can be mapped to each other by a combination of a geometric transformation and a small perturbation, and pioneer the use of space-filling curves for range query data structures.

== Awards and honors ==
Welzl won the Gottfried Wilhelm Leibniz Prize in 1995. He was an Invited Speaker of the International Congress of Mathematicians in Berlin in 1998. He was elected as an ACM Fellow in 1998, as a member of the German Academy of Sciences Leopoldina in 2005, of the Academia Europaea in 2006, and of the Berlin-Brandenburg Academy of Sciences and Humanities in 2007.
