= David M. Eddy =

20th and 21st-century American physician

- Born: 1941 (age 84–85)
- Education: Stanford University, BA; University of Virginia, MD; Stanford University, PhD

David M. Eddy (born 1941) is an American physician, mathematician, and healthcare analyst who has done seminal work in mathematical modeling of diseases, clinical practice guidelines, and evidence-based medicine. Four highlights of his career have been summarized by the Institute of Medicine of the National Academy of Sciences: "more than 25 years ago, Eddy wrote the seminal paper on the role of guidelines in medical decision-making, the first Markov model applied to clinical problems, and the original criteria for coverage decisions; he was the first to use and publish the term 'evidence-based'."

== Education ==
Eddy attended Phillips Exeter Academy, then received a BA in history from Stanford University, MD from the University of Virginia in 1968, and PhD in Engineering-Economic Systems from Stanford in 1978.

== Career ==
Eddy was Chief of the Bioengineering Branch of the US Army Medical Research and Development Command from 1971 to 1973. After obtaining his PhD, he was an assistant professor (1978) and then professor (1980) of Engineering Economic Systems at Stanford. In 1981, he went to Duke University where he was Professor of Health Policy and Management (1981–1986) and then J. Alexander McMahon Professor of Health Policy and Management (1986–1991). Eddy directed Duke's Center for Health Policy Research and Education from 1981 to 1986. In 1987, he resigned the directorship to focus on research and policy. Other positions include Chief Scientist for Blue Cross Blue Shield's Technology and Coverage Program and Medical Advisory Panel from 1984 to 2005, Director of the World Health Organization's Collaborating Center for Research in Cancer Policy from 1984 to 1996, Senior Advisor to Kaiser Permanente from 1991 to 2006, and Special White House Employee on Hillary Clinton's healthcare task force in 1993. Boards include Consumer Union (1982-1987), Board on Mathematic Sciences and their Applications/National Academy of Sciences, and the National Committee for Quality Assurance (NCQA) (1992–1998). In 2006, with Leonard Schlessinger, Eddy founded Archimedes Inc., a healthcare modeling company funded by Kaiser Permanente. Eddy was Chief Medical Officer of Archimedes until he retired in 2013. Eddy continued to teach and consult after he retired, joining the University of South Florida Institute for Advanced Discovery & Innovation in 2014, where he is a member and courtesy professor.

== Research and policy work ==
Eddy published five books and many papers, including a series of 27 essays in JAMA, the Journal of the American Medical Association. Eddy's work spanned several areas.

=== Mathematical models in clinical medicine ===
Eddy was the first to introduce Markov models to clinical medicine. His first model, published in 1976, was designed to analyze screening for cancer. It was used by the Blue Cross Blue Shield Association in 1978 to develop the first set of criteria for the insurance coverage of cancer screening tests. It was then generalized to analyze the progression, monitoring and repair of any probabilistic deteriorating system, and won the 1980 Frederick W. Lanchester Prize for the most important contribution to the field of operations research and management science. The model was used by the American Cancer Society and other organizations to design national and international-level cancer screening policies. This was the first healthcare model to be independently validated against empirical data. In 1987, Eddy developed the CAN*TROL model used by the World Health Organization and National Cancer Institute to help set cancer control priorities both within the United States and Internationally. As a volunteer for WHO, he helped several countries develop cancer control priorities, in particular India, Sri Lanka, and Chile. In 1991, with support from Kaiser Permanente, Eddy began work on a large-scale simulation model of physiology, populations, and healthcare systems, called Archimedes. In 2006, Kaiser Permanente spun out the Archimedes model as a separate corporation. In 2008 the Robert Wood Johnson Foundation provided a $15.5 million grant to make the model readily accessible over the World Wide Web. In 2013 Archimedes, Inc was sold to Evidera.

=== Clinical practice guidelines ===
In 1980, Eddy launched the modern guidelines movement in healthcare when he conducted a study for the American Cancer Society to develop recommendations for screening for cancer. This was the first national level policy designed using formal methods instead of expert opinion. It was also controversial for the fact that it eliminated some commonly used tests and recommended for the first time that many tests, such as Pap smears and colon cancer tests, should done at non-annual frequencies. In 1982, Eddy published a seminal paper in the New England Journal of Medicine that described the role clinical policies and guidelines play in medical decision-making, noted their importance in determining the quality of care, and advocated explicit analysis of evidence and estimation of outcomes. The paper prompted the Council of Medical Specialty Societies to hold a national conference on guidelines in 1987, and ask Eddy to conduct a series of workshops to teach specialty societies how to design guidelines using explicit, evidence-based methods. The manual for those workshops was used in the late 1980s by specialty societies and the Institute of Medicine/National Academy of Sciences, and was published in 1992 by the American College of Physicians. Eddy published a series of 27 articles in JAMA from 1991 to 1994 that laid out the rationale and methods for guidelines, and introduced what have subsequently become standard practices in evidence-based guidelines such as distinguishing between standards, guidelines, and options; formulating the decision problem; constructing evidence tables; preparing balance sheets, and being explicit about the quality of the evidence. From 1991 to 2000, Eddy helped Kaiser Permanente set up an evidence-based guidelines program. In 2011 Eddy and colleagues introduced the concept of "individualized guidelines," which involves tailoring treatment recommendations to each individual patient based on that patient's risk factors, taking into account quantitative information about the patient's probabilities of important outcomes, and the effects on those probabilities of different treatments, one-by-one, and in various combinations.

=== Technology assessment and coverage policies ===
In 1984 the Blue Cross Blue Shield Association asked Eddy to help them create a formal process and evidence-based criteria for designing coverage policies. From 1984 to 2005 he served as advisor to the association's technology evaluation center, which assesses medical technologies, and chief scientist to the association's medical advisory panel, which recommends coverage policies to BCBS plans nationwide. This work introduced the concept of focusing on health outcomes instead of intermediate outcomes or biomarkers, and set a precedent that before a new test or treatment should be covered there must be good evidence that it is effective in improving health outcomes. The coverage criteria developed under Eddy's guidance were tested and vindicated during the national controversy over high dose chemotherapy and bone marrow transplant for late stage breast cancer. In addition to conducting many assessments, Eddy led the development of new Bayesian methods for synthesizing evidence, called the confidence profile method. This work won the 1991 FHP prize from the International Society of Health Technology Assessment for the most important publication of the year.

=== Cost-effectiveness analysis ===
Eddy has been called "the leading expert on cost-effectiveness research and its relationship to public health policy and medical practices." In a series of articles in JAMA, Eddy wrote seminal articles about the importance of taking financial costs into account when designing guidelines and medical policies, and developed theories and methods for setting priorities and rationing healthcare resources. For more than 30 years he has worked with a wide range of national and international-level organizations to apply cost-effectiveness analysis to clinical problems.

=== Performance measurement ===
Starting in 1993, Eddy served on NCQA's Committee on Performance Measurement, which designs measures for evaluating the quality of care delivered by health plans and providers. As chair of the methodology subcommittee, he introduced the use of formal, evidence-based methods. In 2011, he published a new approach to measuring performance that spans across multiple diseases and treatments and is based on outcomes, called the Global Outcomes Score.

=== Evidence-based medicine ===
In the 1980 ACS Guidelines for Cancer Screening, Eddy laid out the principles for what was to become the evidence-based policies and guidelines movement. "First, there must be good evidence that each test or procedure recommended is medically effective in reducing morbidity or mortality; second, the medical benefits must outweigh the risks; third, the cost of each test or procedure must be reasonable compared to its expected benefits; and finally, the recommended actions must be practical and feasible." Throughout the 1980s he wrote papers that exposed the lack of evidence for many clinical practices. He first began to use the term "evidence-based" in 1988 in his workshops to teach specialty societies how to use formal methods to design guidelines. Eddy was also the first to publish the term "evidence-based." In his formulation, an evidence-based policy "explicitly describes the available evidence that pertains to a guideline and ties the guideline to evidence... [It] consciously anchors a guideline, not to current practices or the beliefs of experts, but to experimental evidence...The hallmark of this approach is that it makes a commitment to evidence – the policy must be consistent with and supported by evidence...The pertinent evidence must be identified, described, and analyzed. The policymakers must determine whether the guideline is justified by the evidence. A rationale must be written." Eddy applied these principles throughout his work to help organizations design coverage policies, guidelines, and performance measures. Although the bulk of his work was in cancer, cardiovascular disease, and diabetes, he also analyzed problems in such disparate fields as radiology, osteoporosis, ophthalmology, and youth suicides. As the "evidence-based" movement began to spread through medicine, additional terms such as "evidence-based medicine" were introduced in the context of medical education and individual physician decision-making. In 2005, Eddy offered a unifying definition: "Evidence-based medicine is a set of principles and methods intended to ensure that to the greatest extent possible, medical decisions, guidelines, and other types of policies are based on and consistent with good evidence of effectiveness and benefit."

=== Outcomes-based medicine ===
Throughout his career Eddy has stressed the importance of using quantitative information about the probabilities and magnitudes of health outcomes when making medical decisions or setting medical policies. Eddy began using the term "outcome-based" in his workshops for specialty societies, and first published the term in 1990. He defined the outcomes-based approach as "not only anchoring the guideline to available evidence, but explicitly estimating the outcomes of alternative practices… the guideline must be accompanied not only by a description of the supporting evidence, but also by a description of the important outcomes, the magnitudes of those outcomes, and the method used to derive the estimates."

== Selected awards and honors ==
- Frederick W. Lanchester Prize, Operations Research Society of America and Institute of Management Sciences, 1980
- Election to Institute of Medicine/National Academy of Sciences, 1984
- FHP Prize. International Society of Technology Assessment in Health Care, 1991
- Scientific and Technological Achievement Award. Environmental Protection Agency, 1993
- ADD Science Award for Distinguished Contributions to Medicine. Abbott Laboratories 1995
- US Healthcare Quality Award, 1995
- Outcomes Leadership Award. International Society for Pharmacoeconomics and Outcomes Research (ISPOR) and Novartis, 1997
- Founders Award. American College of Medical Quality, 1998
- Distinguished Achievement Award. Centers for Disease Control and Institute for Quality in Laboratory Medicine, 2005
- Katherine Boucot Sturgis Award, American College of Preventive Medicine, 2006
- Avedis Donabedian Award for Lifetime Achievement. International Society of Pharmacoeconomic Outcomes Research, 2007
- Steven Avery Prize for Lifetime Achievement. Managed Care Pharmacy, 2008
- Fellow of the National Academy of Inventors, 2015
- President's Fellow Medallion from the University of South Florida, 2019
