= List of storms named Gamma =

The name Gamma has been used for two tropical cyclones in the Atlantic Ocean:

- Tropical Storm Gamma (2005) – a late-season tropical storm that produced locally heavy rainfall and flooding in Honduras and Belize.
- Hurricane Gamma (2020) – a Category 1 hurricane that brought heavy rains, floods, and landslides to the Yucatán Peninsula.

== See also ==
Storms with similar names

- Cyclone Gaja (2018) – a North Indian Ocean very severe cyclonic storm.
- Cyclone Gamane (2024) – a South-West Indian Ocean tropical cyclone.
