= Michael Maschler =

Israeli mathematician (1927-2008)

Michael Bahir Maschler
- מיכאל בהיר משלר
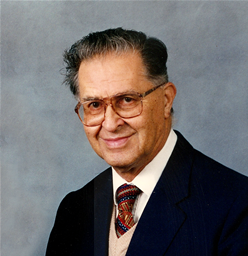
- Born: July 22, 1927; Jerusalem, British Mandate of Palestine
- Died: July 20, 2008 (aged 80); Jerusalem
- Education: Hebrew University of Jerusalem
- Known for: Game theory
- Awards: Frederick W. Lanchester Prize (1995)
- Scientific career
- Fields: Mathematics
- Workplaces: Hebrew University of Jerusalem
- Doctoral advisor: Stefan Bergman (Stanford University) Michael Fekete (Hebrew University)
- Doctoral students: Anna Sfard

Michael Bahir Maschler (Hebrew: מיכאל בהיר משלר; July 22, 1927 – July 20, 2008) was an Israeli mathematician well known for his contributions to the field of game theory. He was a professor in the Einstein Institute of Mathematics and the Center for the Study of Rationality at the Hebrew University of Jerusalem. In 2012, the Israeli Chapter of the Game Theory Society founded the Maschler Prize, an annual prize awarded to an outstanding research student in game theory and related topics in Israel.

== Biography ==
Michael B. Maschler was born in Jerusalem on July 22, 1927.

== Selected publications ==
For a complete list of English and Hebrew publications, see Michael Maschler: In Memoriam, above.

- "The Bargaining Set for Cooperative Games", with R.J. Aumann, 1964, in Advances in Game Theory
- "The Core of a Cooperative Game", with M. Davis, 1965, Naval Research Logistics Quarterly
- "Game-Theoretic Aspects of Gradual Disarmament", with R.J. Aumann, 1966, Mathematica
- "Some Thoughts on the Minimax Principle" with R.J. Aumann, 1972, Management Science
- "An Advantage of the Bargaining Set over the Core", 1976, JET
- "Geometric Properties of the Kernel, Nucleolus and Related Solution Concepts", with B. Peleg and L.S. Shapley, 1979, Mathematics of Operations Research
- "Superadditive Solution for the Nash bargaining Game", with M. Perles, 1981, IJGT
- "Game Theoretic Analysis of a Bankruptcy Problem from the Talmud", with R.J. Aumann, 1985, JET
- "The Consistent Shapley Value for Hyperplane Games", with G. Owen, 1989, IJGT
- "The Consistent Shapley Value for Games without Side Payments", with G. Owen, 1992, in Selten, editor, Rational Interaction
- "The Bargaining Set, Kernel and Nucleolus", 1992, in Aumann and Hart, editors, Handbook of Game Theory
- Repeated Games with Incomplete Information, MIT Press, Cambridge, 1995, with R.J. Aumann
- Insights into Game Theory: An Alternative Mathematical Experience, Cambridge University Press, forthcoming, with Ein-Ya Gura.

== Sources ==
- Aumann, Robert J.; Gura, Ein-Ya; Hart, Sergiu (2008). "Michael Maschler: In Memoriam" (PDF). Hebrew University of Jerusalem. Archived from the original (PDF) on 16 July 2011.
