= Concorde TSP Solver =

Program for solving the travelling salesman problem

Concorde
- Original author(s): David Applegate, Robert Bixby, Václav Chvátal, William J. Cook
- Initial release: August 27, 1997; 27 years ago
- Stable release: 03.12.19 / December 19, 2003; 21 years ago
- Repository: www.math.uwaterloo.ca/tsp/concorde/downloads/downloads.htm
- Written in: C
- Operating system: Linux, Oracle Solaris, Microsoft Windows (with Cygwin)
- Size: 1.3 MB
- Available in: English
- Type: Mathematical optimization software
- License: Source-available, free for academic research
- Website: www.math.uwaterloo.ca/tsp/concorde.html

The Concorde TSP Solver is a program for solving the travelling salesman problem. It was written by David Applegate, Robert E. Bixby, Vašek Chvátal, and William J. Cook, in ANSI C, and is freely available for academic use.

Concorde has been applied to problems of gene mapping, protein function prediction, vehicle routing, conversion of bitmap images to continuous line drawings, scheduling ship movements for seismic surveys, and in studying the scaling properties of combinatorial optimization problems.

According to Mulder & Wunsch (2003), Concorde “is widely regarded as the fastest TSP solver, for large instances, currently in existence.” In 2001, Concorde won a 5000 guilder prize from CMG for solving a vehicle routing problem the company had posed in 1996.

Concorde requires a linear programming solver and only supports QSopt and CPLEX 8.0.
