= Coreset =

Computational geometry and optimization concept

In computational geometry and approximation algorithms, a coreset is a small, possibly weighted subset of an input point set that approximately preserves the value of a specified optimization problem. Solving the problem on the coreset yields a solution whose cost is provably close to the optimal solution for the full dataset. Coresets are widely used in geometric optimization, cluster analysis, data streams, and large-scale machine learning to reduce computational complexity while maintaining theoretical guarantees.

Many geometric optimization problems admit coresets of size bounded by a function of the approximation parameter ε and the dimension, but independent of the input size. When such a coreset can be constructed in linear or near-linear time, it yields a polynomial-time approximation scheme (PTAS) or efficient approximation algorithm.

The concept of coresets emerged in the late 1990s and early 2000s within computational geometry, as part of a broader effort to develop approximation schemes for high-dimensional geometric problems. Early work connected coresets to ε-approximations and ε-nets in range spaces and VC dimension theory. Subsequent research extended the framework to clustering, streaming models, and distributed computation. Over time, coresets became a central tool in large-scale data analysis, particularly for clustering and regression problems, where exact computation on massive datasets is computationally infeasible.

== Definition ==
Let $P$ be a finite set of points and let $f(P, x)$ denote the cost of a candidate solution $x$ to an optimization problem defined on $P$. For example, in $k$-means clustering, $x$ may represent a set of $k$ centers and $f(P, x)$ the sum of squared distances from points in $P$ to their nearest center.

A (strong) ε-coreset for $P$ with respect to $f$ is a (possibly weighted) subset $S \subseteq P$ such that for all candidate solutions $x$,

$$(1 - \varepsilon)\, f(P, x) \le f(S, x) \le (1 + \varepsilon)\, f(P, x),$$

where $\varepsilon > 0$ is a user-defined approximation parameter.

In many constructions, $S$ is equipped with weights $w(p)$ so that

$$f(S, x) = \sum_{p \in S} w(p)\, c(p, x),$$

where $c(p, x)$ is the contribution of point $p$ to the cost.

Some literature distinguishes between:

- Strong coresets: The approximation guarantee holds uniformly for all candidate solutions $x$.
- Weak coresets: The guarantee holds only for solutions near the optimum.

== Construction techniques ==
Coresets are typically constructed using one or more of the following techniques:

- Importance sampling: Points are sampled with probability proportional to their sensitivity (their maximum relative influence on the objective function).
- Random sampling and ε-approximations: Techniques from VC theory are used to guarantee uniform convergence.
- Geometric partitioning: Space is partitioned and representative points are selected from each region.
- Merge-and-reduce frameworks: Used in streaming and distributed settings to maintain coresets over time.

For many problems, the size of the coreset is $O(g(\varepsilon, d))$, where $d$ is the dimension and the bound does not depend on the input size $n$.

== Applications ==
=== Clustering ===
Coresets are widely used in clustering problems such as k-means clustering, k-median, and metric k-center. For example, in $k$-means clustering in Euclidean space, one can construct a coreset of size $O(k / \varepsilon^2)$ (up to logarithmic factors in some settings), independent of $n$. Running an exact or heuristic clustering algorithm on the coreset yields a $(1 + \varepsilon)$-approximation for the original dataset.

This enables scalable clustering in large datasets and forms the basis of several practical machine learning systems.

=== Geometric optimization ===
Coresets have been developed for problems including:

- Minimum enclosing ball
- Facility location
- Projective clustering
- Shape fitting

In low-dimensional settings, coresets often yield polynomial-time approximation schemes.

=== Regression and machine learning ===
In regression problems such as least-squares fitting, coresets provide smaller weighted datasets that preserve the objective value. They are also used in:

- Support vector machines
- Subspace approximation
- Hyperparameter optimization

More recently, coresets have been explored for dataset summarization and acceleration of training in large-scale machine learning pipelines.

== Streaming and distributed computation ==
In streaming models, data points arrive sequentially and storage is limited. Merge-and-reduce techniques maintain a small coreset whose size depends only on ε and problem parameters. Similarly, in distributed systems, composable coresets allow each machine to compute a local coreset, which can then be combined centrally while preserving approximation guarantees.

== Related concepts ==
Coresets are related to:

- ε-approximations and ε-nets in range spaces
- Randomized sketching techniques
- Dimensionality reduction
- Sublinear and streaming algorithms
