= William J. Cook =

American mathematician

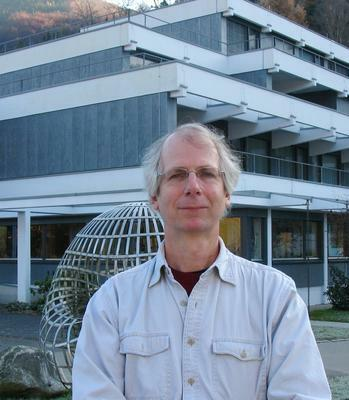
- Born: New Jersey
- Education: Rutgers University (1979); Stanford University (1980); University of Waterloo (1983)
- Scientific career
- Fields: Mathematics
- Institutions: University of Waterloo; Cornell University; Bell Communications Research; University of Bonn; Rice University; Georgia Tech; University of Pittsburgh
- Thesis: On Some Aspects of Totally Dual Integral Systems (1983)
- Doctoral advisor: U. S. R. Murty

William John Cook (born October 18, 1957 in New Jersey) is an American operations researcher and mathematician, and Professor of Combinatorics and Optimization at the University of Waterloo.

He was elected a member of the National Academy of Engineering in 2011 for theoretical and computational contributions to discrete optimization.

He is known for his work on the traveling salesman problem and is one of the authors of the Concorde TSP Solver.

== Professional career ==
Cook did his undergraduate studies at Rutgers University, graduating in 1979 with a bachelor's degree in mathematics. After earning a master's degree in operations research from Stanford University in 1980, he moved to the University of Waterloo, where he earned a Ph.D. in combinatorics and optimization in 1983 under the supervision of U. S. R. Murty. After postdoctoral studies at the University of Bonn, he joined the Cornell University faculty in 1985, moved to Columbia University in 1987, and in 1988 joined the research staff of Bell Communications Research. In 1994 he returned to academia as John von Neumann Professor at the University of Bonn, and in 1996 he moved to Rice University as Noah Harding Professor of Computational and Applied Mathematics. In 2002 he took his position at Georgia Tech. In January 2013, he moved to the University of Pittsburgh as the John Swanson Professor of Industrial Engineering, before returning to the University of Waterloo in June 2013 as a professor in the Department of Combinatorics and Optimization, and subsequently University Professor. From 2018-2020 he worked at Johns Hopkins University as a Professor of Applied Mathematics and Statistics.

He is the founding editor-in-chief of the journal Mathematical Programming Computation (since 2008), and the former editor-in-chief of Mathematical Programming (Series B from 1993 to 2003, and Series A from 2003 to 2007).

== Awards and honors ==
In 1998 he was an Invited Speaker at the International Congress of Mathematicians in Berlin. He won the Beale–Orchard-Hays Prize of the Mathematical Programming Society in 2000, and his book The Traveling Salesman Problem: A Computational Study won the Frederick W. Lanchester Prize of INFORMS in 2007.

He became a fellow of the Society for Industrial and Applied Mathematics in 2009, and of INFORMS in 2010. He was elected to the National Academy of Engineering in 2011. In 2012 he became a fellow of the American Mathematical Society.

== Selected publications ==
=== Books ===
- Combinatorial Optimization (with William Cunningham, William R. Pulleyblank, and Alexander Schrijver, John Wiley and Sons, 1998); 2011 pbk reprint
- The Traveling Salesman Problem: A Computational Study (with David L. Applegate, Robert E. Bixby, and Václav Chvátal, Princeton University Press, 2006; Frederick W. Lanchester Prize, 2007)
- In Pursuit of the Traveling Salesman: Mathematics at the Limits of Computation, Princeton University Press, 2012.
