= Bruce Reed (mathematician) =

Canadian mathematician

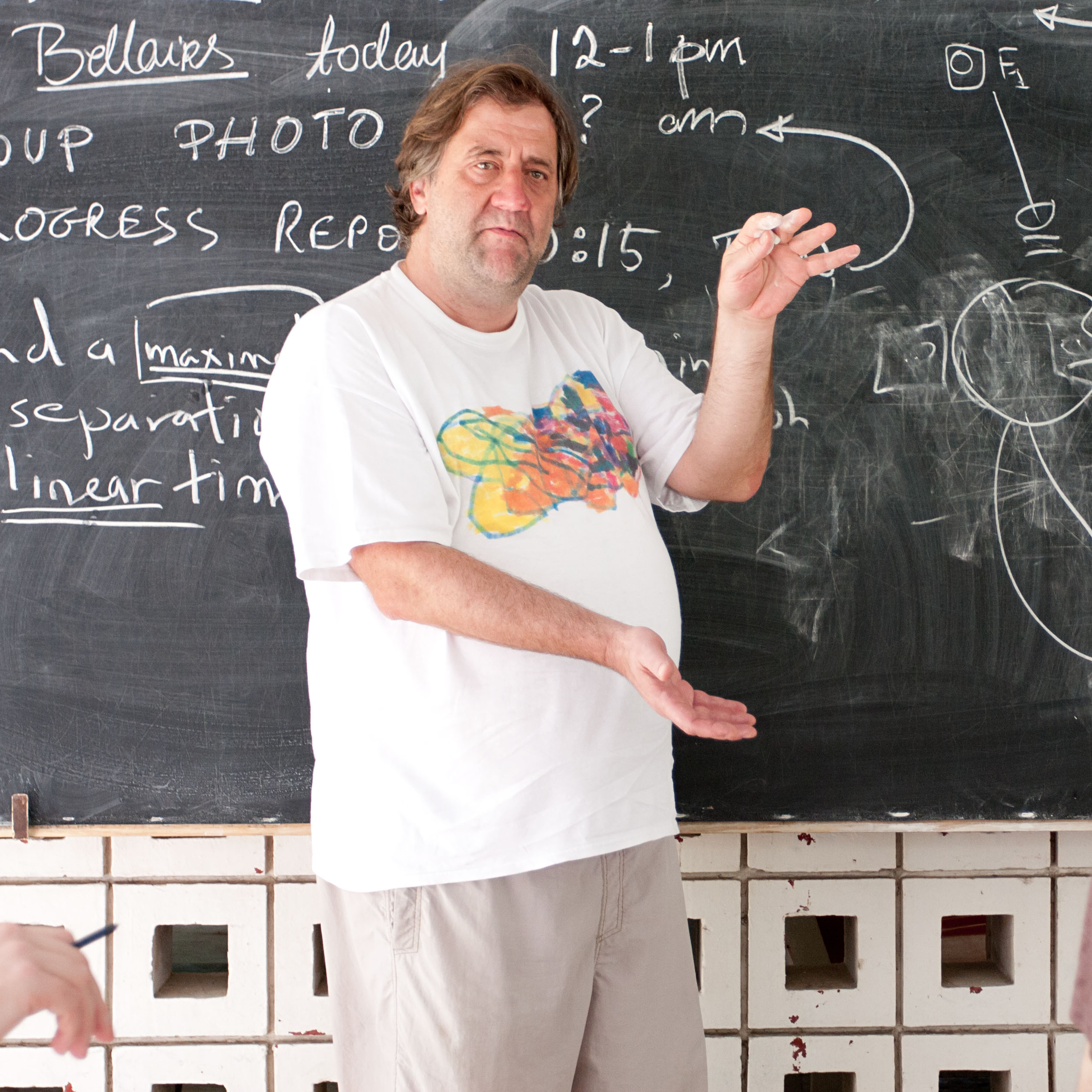
Bruce Reed at the Bellairs Research Institute, 2015

Bruce Alan Reed FRSC is a Canadian mathematician and computer scientist, a former Canada Research Chair in Graph Theory at McGill University. His research is primarily in graph theory. He is a distinguished research fellow of the Institute of Mathematics in the Academia Sinica, Taiwan, and an adjunct professor at the University of Victoria in Canada.

== Academic career ==
Reed earned his Ph.D. in 1986 from McGill, under the supervision of Vašek Chvátal. Before returning to McGill as a Canada Research Chair, Reed held positions at the University of Waterloo, Carnegie Mellon University, and the French National Centre for Scientific Research.

Reed was elected as a fellow of the Royal Society of Canada in 2009, and is the recipient of the 2013 CRM-Fields-PIMS Prize.

In 2021 he left McGill, and subsequently became a researcher at the Academia Sinica and an adjunct professor at the University of Victoria.

== Research ==
Reed's thesis research concerned perfect graphs. With Michael Molloy, he is the author of a book on graph coloring and the probabilistic method. Reed has also published highly cited papers on the giant component in random graphs with a given degree sequence,^{[MR95]}^{[MR98a]} random satisfiability problems,^{[CR92]} acyclic coloring,^{[AMR91]} tree decomposition,^{[R92]}^{[R97]} and constructive versions of the Lovász local lemma.^{[MR98b]}

He was an invited speaker at the International Congress of Mathematicians in 2002. His talk there concerned a proof by Reed and Benny Sudakov, using the probabilistic method, of a conjecture by Kyoji Ohba that graphs whose number of vertices and chromatic number are (asymptotically) within a factor of two of each other have equal chromatic number and list chromatic number.^{[RS02]}

== Selected publications ==
=== Articles ===
| AMR91. | Alon, Noga; McDiarmid, Colin; Reed, Bruce (1991), "Acyclic coloring of graphs", Random Structures & Algorithms, 2 (3): 277–288, doi:10.1002/rsa.3240020303, MR 1109695. |

| CR92. | Chvátal, V.; Reed, B. (1992), "Mick gets some (the odds are on his side)", Proc. 33rd Annual Symposium on Foundations of Computer Science, pp. 620–627, doi:10.1109/SFCS.1992.267789, ISBN 978-0-8186-2900-6, S2CID 5575389. |

| R92. | Reed, Bruce A. (1992), "Finding approximate separators and computing tree width quickly", Proc. 24th Annual ACM Symposium on Theory of computing, pp. 221–228, doi:10.1145/129712.129734, ISBN 978-0897915113, S2CID 16259988. |

| MR95. | Molloy, Michael; Reed, Bruce (1995), "A critical point for random graphs with a given degree sequence", Random Structures & Algorithms, 6 (2–3): 161–179, doi:10.1002/rsa.3240060204, MR 1370952. |

| R97. | Reed, B. A. (1997), "Tree width and tangles: a new connectivity measure and some applications", Surveys in combinatorics, 1997 (London), London Math. Soc. Lecture Note Ser., vol. 241, Cambridge: Cambridge Univ. Press, pp. 87–162, doi:10.1017/CBO9780511662119.006, ISBN 9780511662119, MR 1477746. |

| MR98a. | Molloy, Michael; Reed, Bruce (1998), "The size of the giant component of a random graph with a given degree sequence", Combinatorics, Probability and Computing, 7 (3): 295–305, doi:10.1017/S0963548398003526, hdl:1807/9487, MR 1664335, S2CID 3712019. |

| MR98b. | Molloy, Michael; Reed, Bruce (1998), "Further algorithmic aspects of the local lemma", Proc. 30th Annual ACM Symposium on Theory of computing, pp. 524–529, doi:10.1145/276698.276866, hdl:1807/9484, ISBN 978-0897919623, S2CID 9446727. |

| RS02. | Reed, Bruce; Sudakov, Benny (2002), "List colouring of graphs with at most (2 − o(1))χ vertices", Proceedings of the International Congress of Mathematicians, Vol. III (Beijing, 2002), Higher Ed. Press, Beijing, pp. 587–603, arXiv:math/0304467, Bibcode:2003math......4467R, MR 1957563. |

=== Books ===
| MR02. | Molloy, Michael; Reed, Bruce (2002), Graph Colouring and the Probabilistic Method, Algorithms and Combinatorics, vol. 23, Berlin: Springer-Verlag, ISBN 978-3-540-42139-9. |
