= Athens College =

Hellenic American Educational Foundation Athens College-Psychico College
- Athens; Greece

Information
- Type: Independent Elementary-Middle-High School
- Motto: Άνδρας Τρέφον (Nurturing Men)
- Established: 1925
- Campus: Urban (38 acres)
- Website: athenscollege.edu.gr

Athens College (Greek: Κολλέγιο(ν) Αθηνών; formally Hellenic-American Educational Foundation (HAEF), Ελληνο-Αμερικανικό Εκπαιδευτικό Ίδρυμα) is a co-educational private preparatory school in Psychiko, Greece, a suburb of Athens, part of the Hellenic-American Educational Foundation (Ελληνοαμερικανικό Εκπαιδευτικό Ίδρυμα) which also includes Psychico College, although both schools are usually referred to as "Athens College". It was established in 1925. Among the school's founders and big donors had been Emmanuel Benakis, namesake of the Benaki Museum of Athens, as well as the school's main building, and Stephanos Deltas who the school's athletic facilities were named by. Instruction is in both Greek and English, while also including French lessons 2 hours a week.

== Overview ==
The 3,000 students are divided among Athens and Psychico College, each of which includes a Kindergarten, an Elementary School, a middle school, and an upper school. The upper school of Psychico College also offers students interested in studies abroad the International Baccalaureate programme. In addition the adult education program enrolls 2,000 students.

Athens College's library is one of the largest school libraries in Europe and was the first in Greece to have all its books electronically cataloged. The sporting facilities of Athens College include a gym, two football pitches (one gravel), seven outdoor basketball courts, four outdoor tennis courts, an indoor swimming pool, a track & field court, and an indoor sports center with facilities for squash, table tennis, gymnastics, volleyball, martial arts, and other events.

Athens College is incorporated in both Greece and the State of New York and is a not-for-profit, tax-exempt organization. In indication of its special status is its scholarship program (funded by the parents associations and the alumni club SAKA) which has provided students from various socioeconomic levels the option to study there.

== History ==
Athens College was established in 1925 by a group of Greeks (Emmanuel Benakis and Stephanos Delta among them) with the support of American philhellenes, including Dr. Bert Hodge, Director of the American School of Classical Studies at Athens.

== Athens College, 1925–1980 ==
The Founding Committee of Athens College, which became its board of directors, was organized in May 1924. Its members were Epaminondas Charilaos, President of the Chamber of Commerce and Industry, Bert Hodge Hill, Director of the American School of Classical Studies, Stephanos Delta, retired businessman and treasurer of the Refugee Settlement Commission, Stavros Papadakis, YMCA. secretary, Emmanuel Benakis, retired businessman, former Minister and former Mayor of Athens, Petros Calligas, former Minister, Harold Jacquith, Director of the Near East Relief, Nicolas Kyriakides, shipowner. Later, Emmanuel Benakis who has been a major donator for the college, was named emeritus member and was replaced at the committee by his son Antonios.

Another notable founding member is Ery Kehaya, who was chairman of the standard commercial and tobacco company inc.

During the academic year 1930–31, the number of the pupils reached 351, and the number of professors 44 (9 were Americans, the rest of them Greek). A seventh year was then added to the six-year Gymnasium. This supplementary year will be a particularity of Athens College.

During the 1930s, the college had many economic difficulties, and new collects were then organized. With money from various sponsors, new buildings have been constructed, the library has been founded as well a scholarship fund. Homer Davis, who was acting director of the college after the departure of Dewing in 1930, was named its president in 1932. He will keep this charge until 1960, and will be Acting President in 1964–65. The Greek co-directors during those years, were Michael Michaelides-Nouaros (1925–27), Demetrius Georgakis (1927–36), Emmanuel Troulinos (1936–62), Constantine Lalopoulos (1962–73) and Sofocles Markianos (1973–78).

In 1974, after the Turkish invasion of Cyprus, Athens College accepted 30 Greek Cypriot refugees into the College Boarding Department and gave them full scholarships.

== Athens College, 1980–present ==
Athens College (and its sister school, Psychico College, founded in 1980) is owned by the Hellenic-American Educational Foundation, a non-profit organization with facilities located in Psychico (Middle and High Schools and the International Baccalaureate Diploma Program) and Kantza in eastern Attica (two elementary schools: Bodossakio and Latsio).

When it first began, in October 1925, Athens College occupied a rented building on 18 Androu Street in the heart of Athens. The school moved to Psychico in 1929. That same year, the Benaki Hall was dedicated by Eleftherios Venizelos, then Greece's Prime Minister and an ardent supporter of the school. In his speech during the dedication ceremony, Venizelos made some memorable remarks:

"... Private schools are where the greatest and most successful innovations may flourish: loosely supervised by the State and complying with broad State guidelines, private schools enjoy the freedom which public schools lack and, therefore, may achieve great progress. This is the kind of progress we expect Athens College to achieve. This is my judgment of the significance of the College."

== Notable alumni ==
=== Government and politics ===
- Andreas Papandreou (1938), economist and Prime Minister of Greece (1981-1985, 1985-1989, 1993–1996).
- George Papandreou (1971), Prime Minister of Greece from 2009 to 2011; Foreign Minister (1999–2004).
- Lucas Papademos (1966), economist and Vice President of the European Central Bank (2002–2010), caretaker Prime Minister of Greece (2011–2012)
- Antonis Samaras (1970), Prime Minister of Greece from 2012 to 2015.
- Stavros Lambrinidis (1980), Ambassador of the European Union to the United States (2019–2023).
- Kyriakos Mitsotakis (1986), Greek Prime Minister since 2019.
- Stefanos Kasselakis

=== Academics ===
- Michael Dertouzos (1954), former director of the M.I.T. Laboratory for Computer Science.
- Costis Maglaras (1987), dean of Columbia Business School.
- Yiannis N. Moschovakis (1956), set theorist at UCLA.
- Alexander Nehamas (1964), professor of Humanities, Philosophy and Comparative Literature at Princeton University.
- Nikiforos Diamandouros (1961), academic, European Ombudsman (2003–2013).
- Anthony Kaldellis, Professor of Classics and Byzantinist, Ohio State University.
- Dimitris Krallis, Professor of Humanities, Byzantinist, and Director of the Stavros Niarchos Foundation Centre for Hellenic Studies at Simon Fraser University.
- Peter Diamandopoulos, academic, President of Sonoma State University (1977–1983) and Adelphi University (1985–1997)

=== Business and finance ===
- Stavros S. Niarchos (1928), shipping magnate
- Costas Lemos (1936), shipping magnate
- Spiros Latsis (1965), shipping magnate and founder of Eurobank Ergasias
- Giannis Vardinogiannis (1980), shipping magnate
- George Prokopiou (1964), shipowner, founder of Dynacom Tankers, Sea Traders and Dynagas.
- Georgios Vernicos (1968), Greek entrepreneur, social activist.
- George Economou (1972), shipbuilder

=== Literature and art ===
- Nikos Dimou (1954), writer and broadcaster
- Apostolos Doxiadis (1972), author of international bestsellers Uncle Petros and Goldbach's Conjecture (1992) and Logicomix (2009).
- Dimitris Papaioannou, theater stage director and choreographer

=== Athletics ===
- Maria Sakkari (2013), professional tennis player, ranked as high as world No. 3 by Women's Tennis Association

== Sources ==
- Homer W. Davis, The story of Athens College: The first thirty-five years, 1925–1960, ISBN 960-85002-1-4. Davis was its first president.
- Δημήτρη Καραμάνου, Κολλέγιον Αθηνών, 1925–2000: Σταθμοί και Ορόσημα.
