= Karen Livescu =

American computer scientist

Karen Livescu is an American computer scientist specializing in speech processing and natural language processing, and applications of deep learning to these topics. She is a professor in the Toyota Technological Institute at Chicago and a part-time associate professor of computer science at the University of Chicago.

== Education and career ==
Livescu majored in physics at Princeton University, graduating in 1996 with an honors thesis on signal processing in speech supervised by computer scientist Kenneth Steiglitz. After visiting the Technion – Israel Institute of Technology, she received a master's degree in 1999 and a Ph.D. in 2005 from the Massachusetts Institute of Technology (MIT). Her doctoral dissertation, Feature-Based Pronunciation Modeling for Automatic Speech Recognition, was supervised by James Glass.

She became a Clare Boothe Luce Postdoctoral Lecturer at MIT, and then a research assistant professor at the Toyota Technological Institute, before becoming a regular-rank assistant professor at the Toyota Technological Institute in 2008. In 2009 she added a part-time faculty position in the Computer Science Department at the University of Chicago. She was promoted to associate professor at both the Toyota Technological Institute and the University of Chicago in 2017, and to full professor at the Toyota Technological Institute in 2021.

== Recognition ==
Livescu was named a Fellow of the International Speech Communication Association in 2021, "for contributions to articulatory modeling, to speech representation learning, and to bridging the gaps between speech research, machine learning and natural language processing". She was named to the 2025 class of IEEE Fellows "for contributions to multi-view and pre-trained speech representation learning".
