= I Saw the Figure 5 in Gold =

Painting by Charles Demuth

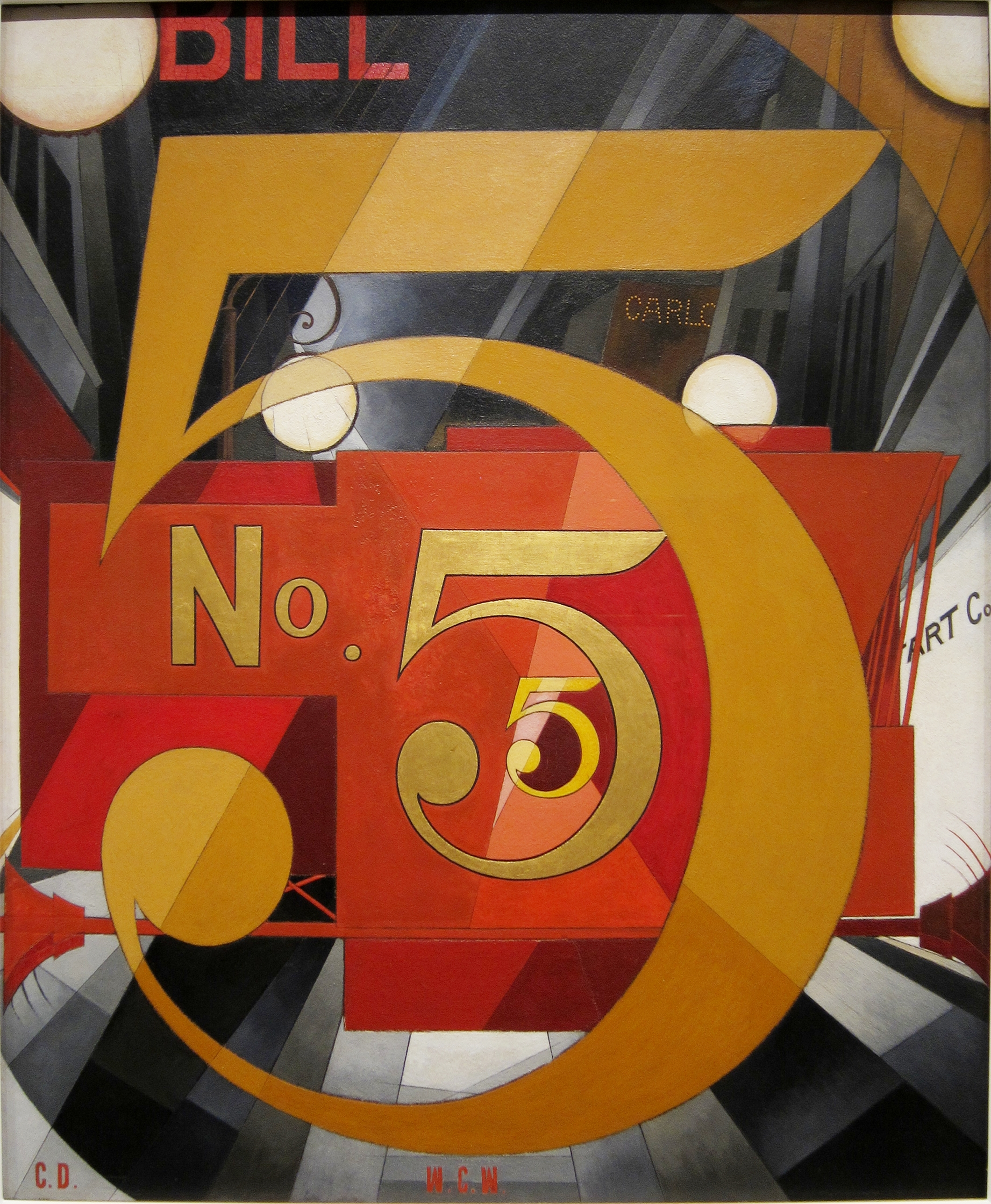
- Artist: Charles Demuth
- Year: 1928
- Dimensions: 90.2 cm × 76.2 cm (35.5 in × 30 in)
- Location: Metropolitan Museum of Art, New York

I Saw the Figure 5 in Gold, also known as The Figure 5 in Gold, is a 1928 painting by American artist Charles Demuth. It has been described as influenced by Futurism and Cubism.

== Inspiration ==
William Carlos Williams claims that the inspiration for the 32-word poem "The Great Figure" (1920) came from seeing a fire engine pass him by, sounding gong clangs and siren howls as it receded in the night. He said he was so struck by the sight that he took paper and pencil out of his pocket and wrote the poem, standing there on the sidewalk. Two lines: "I saw the figure 5 / in gold" were taken by Demuth for his painting's title. The upper right corner has an arc, implying a fragment of a large number five, repeated three times in progressively smaller, complete number fives to create an impression of the fire engine moving away from the viewer. The fire engine itself is reduced to an abstracted form composed of red rectangles, but there is a hint of a ladder on the right side and an axle across the bottom. Above the truck are globular streetlamps flanked by sidewalks and buildings in blacks and grays. Demuth conveyed his friendship with Williams by incorporating fragments of his name: "Bill" across the top, and "CARLO" (the "O" cut off and the "S" missing entirely) in yellow dots as in an illuminated theater sign. Across the bottom the painter has placed his own initials "C.D." and also the poet's "W.C.W." in the same size and color.

== Style ==
Demuth was known as a painter in the Precisionist style, incorporating clean lines and geometry into images. Art historian H.W. Janson mentions Demuth's interactions with Cubist painters in New York, and the connections between Futurism and Precisionism styles. This particular work was part of a series of five abstract, poster-style portraits Demuth painted between 1924 and 1929 in homage to his personal artist and writer friends: William Carlos Williams, Georgia O'Keeffe, Arthur Dove, Charles Duncan and John Marin. He and Williams had become friends when they were both living in the same boarding house in Philadelphia while Demuth was studying at the Pennsylvania Academy of the Fine Arts and Williams was attending the University of Pennsylvania School of Medicine. As with I Saw the Figure 5 in Gold, each painting incorporated the artist's name. This portrait series is often described as also including writers Marsden Hartley, Gertrude Stein, Eugene O'Neill and Wallace Stevens, but those four were never completed. The Yale University Art Gallery has the preliminary sketch, in watercolor and graphite, for the Marsden Hartley portrait.

== Reception and legacy ==
The painting was first exhibited at Intimate Gallery, New York as "Charles Demuth: Five Paintings," April 29 – May 18, 1929. It is in the permanent collection of the Metropolitan Museum of Art, New York, United States of America. It is described as a combination of oil paint, graphite, ink, and gold leaf on paperboard. Dimensions 35 1/2 by 30 inches (90 cm × 76 cm). Demuth died in 1935, at the age of 51 years. He bequeathed the painting to Georgia O'Keeffe. She donated it to the Met in 1948 as part of the Alfred Stieglitz Collection. The painting has never been sold.

Roberta Smith described the work in The New York Times: "Demuth's famous visionary accounting of Williams, I Saw the Figure Five in Gold, [is] a painting whose title and medallion-like arrangement of angled forms were both inspired by a verse the poet wrote after watching a fire engine streak past him on a rainy Manhattan street while waiting for Marsden Hartley, whose studio he was visiting, to answer his door." Describing its importance, Judith H. Dobrzynski in The Wall Street Journal wrote: "It's the best work in a genre Demuth created, the 'poster portrait'. It's a witty homage to his close friend, the poet William Carlos Williams, and a transliteration into the paint of his poem 'The Great Figure'. It's a decidedly American work made at a time when U.S. artists were just moving beyond European influences. It's a reference to the intertwined relationships among the arts in the 1920s, a moment of cross-pollination that led to American Modernism. And it anticipates pop art."

Robert Indiana, a popular and famous artist from the 1960s onward, painted The Figure Five in 1963. It incorporated the three yellow/gold, size-diminishing number fives from Charles Demuth's painting superimposed over a red star.

Demuth's painting is used as the cover picture of the novel Uncle Petros and Goldbach's Conjecture (1992). The painting is included in a book 100 Best Paintings in New York (2008).

In March 2013, the US Postal Service issued a pane of 12 first-class postage stamps portraying modern art, one of which was Demuth's painting. The timing was 100 years after the Armory Show, New York, 1913, which had given many Americans their first look at modern art. The stamp set was titled Modern Art in America 1913–1931 Stamps.
