= Alecos Papadatos =

Greek comic book writer and illustrator (born 1959)

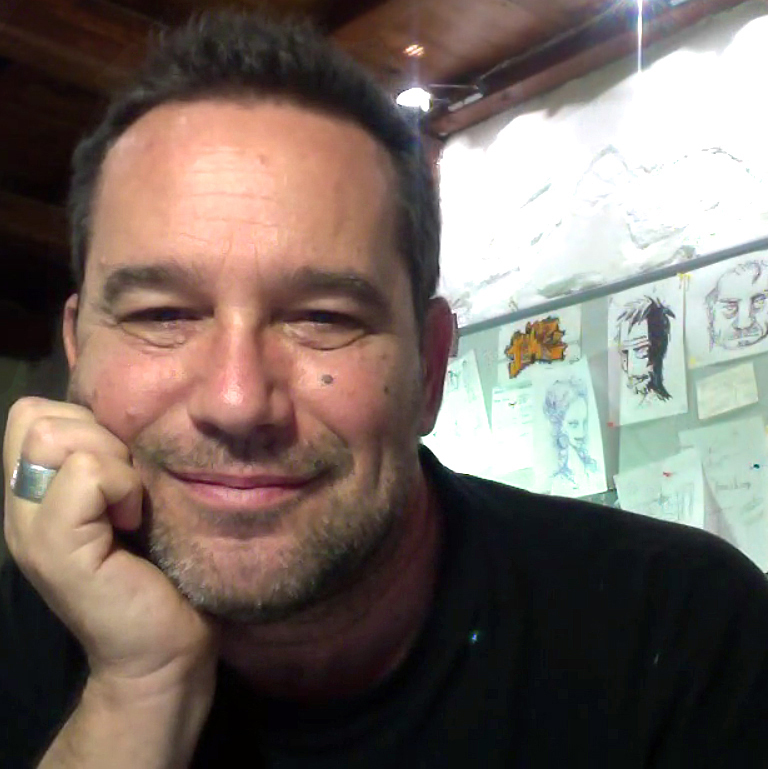
Photo of Alecos Papadatos

Alecos Papadatos (Greek: Αλέκος Παπαδάτος, Alekos Papadatos; born 1959) is a Greek comic book writer and illustrator, best known as the artist of Logicomix, a graphic novel written by Apostolos Doxiadis and Christos Papadimitriou. Logicomix was the No. 1 New York Times Best Seller Paperback Graphic Book of October 18, 2009.

== Early life and education ==
Papadatos was born in Thessaloniki, Greece. He started drawing cartoons since very young and all through his years of high school at Anatolia College. After graduating from the Aristotle University of Thessaloniki with a degree in economics, Papadatos went on to receive an M.A. in Aesthetics from the Paris 1 Panthéon-Sorbonne University. Simultaneously, he began to study animation and cartoon design which led to work as animator for French TV.

== Career ==
In 1988, Papadatos won First Prize in the Special Technique (Animated Cartoons) category at the short-length Film Festival of Drama, Greece, for his animated film, Τzitziki and Myrmigi (Greek: Τζιτζίκι και Μυρμήγκι; German: Die Grille und die Ameise), based on one of Aesop's Fables, The Ant and the Grasshopper. In 1989, he won an official Greek participation at the Berlin International Film Festival. The same year, he worked as animator of the cartoon Babar, co-produced by Canal+, Paris and Nelvana, Toronto.

In 1991, Papadatos moved to Athens, Greece. There, in collaboration with animator Annie Di Donna, he taught animation and film production. His studio, Spicy Toons, produced TV cartoon commercials in 2D/3D for the Greek and European market as well as animation for educational documentaries. Papadatos worked as a cartoonist for the major Athens daily To Vima. He also illustrated the covers of Uncle Petros and Goldbach's Conjecture; Gutter (Γκάτερ); and, Εγώ ο Ζάχος Ζάχαρης.

Papadatos began illustrating Logicomix in 2003, on a full-time basis, until its completion in 2008. A film shot during the writing and production of the novel, Making of Logicomix, depicted the creative process from outline, to story writing, to illustrating and coloring, to final product. Logicomix received numerous awards and favorable reviews where Papadatos’ art was described as “crisp and simple in the clear-line manner of Hergé," as possessing “real graphic verve. (Even though I’m a text guy, I couldn’t keep my eyes off the witty drawings),” “ingeniously charming,” and “compelling.”

Papadatos’ illustrations are found in different Greek and foreign magazines, among them, Athens Voice, The Financial Times and Publishers Weekly. Papadatos is one of the artists in a comics anthology inspired by Heavy Liquid, the LP of the Greek rock band, The Last Drive, which won the prize for Best Comics Anthology at the 2011 Athens Comicdom Awards.

Papadatos is the sole cover illustrator for The Books' Journal, a Greek paper publication exploring the world of books, politics, ideas, literature and the arts.

His latest project released in 2015, Democracy, is a graphic novel he co-wrote with Abraham Kawa and co-illustrated with Annie Di Donna. It is a fictional account recalling the birth of a new political system in ancient Greece.

== Personal life ==
Papadatos lives in Athens with his wife and two children. When he is not drawing, he enjoys playing the tzouras or the bouzouki with Tzamba Manges, a small ensemble which performs rebetiko.
