= Lancaster Arts Hotel =

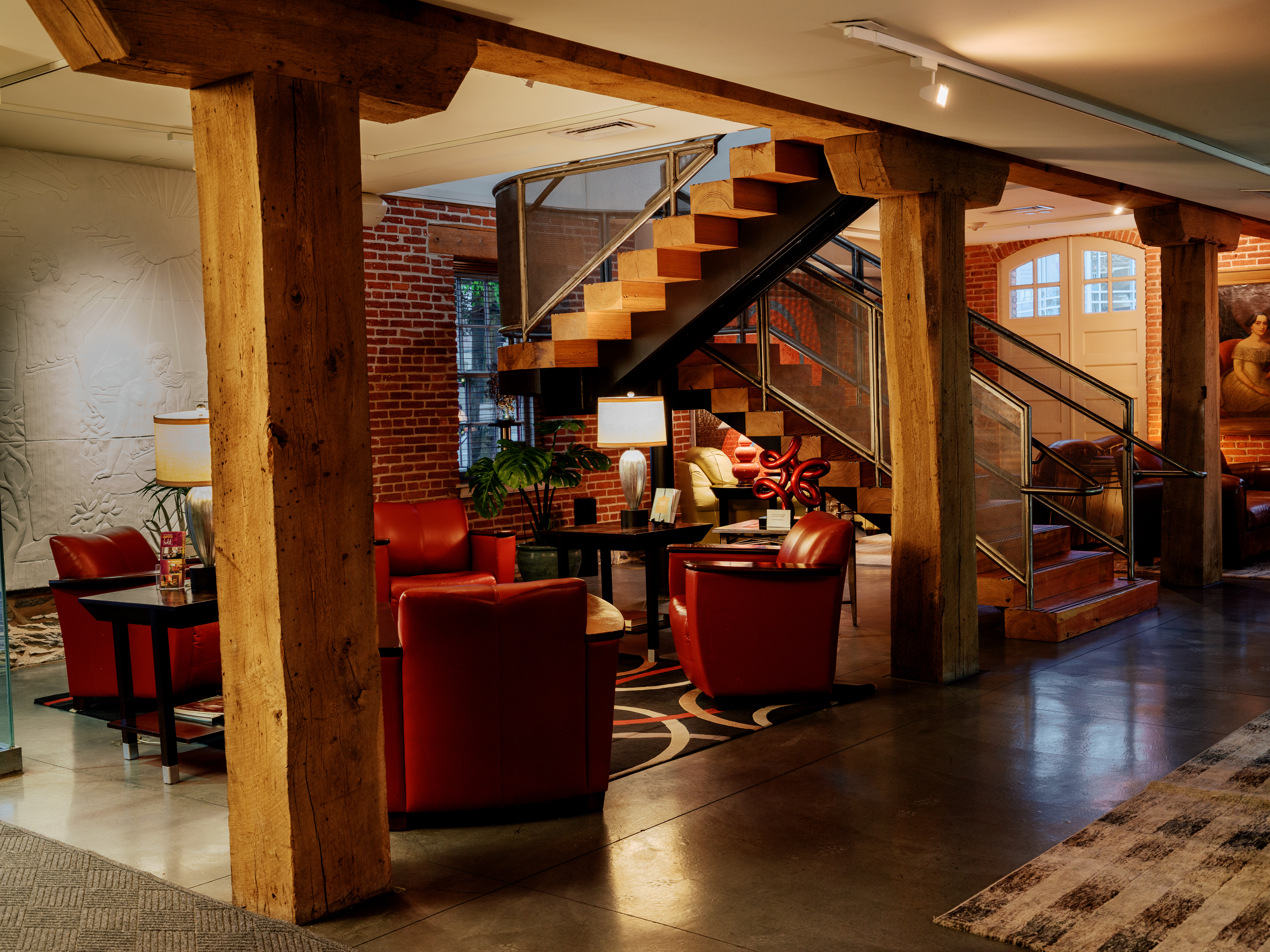
- Main view of the hotel lobby

- Location within Pennsylvania

General information
- Location: 300 Harriburg Avenue; Lancaster, Pennsylvania
- Coordinates: 40°2′49″N 76°18′44″W
- Opening: 2006

Technical details
- Floor count: 3 1/2

Other information
- Number of rooms: 63

Website
- lancasterartshotel.com
- Rosenbaum Tobacco Warehouse
- U.S. Historic district – Contributing property
- Built: c. 1881
- Part of: Harrisburg Avenue Tobacco Historic District (ID90001393)
- Designated CP: September 21, 1990

The Lancaster Arts Hotel is a boutique hotel located in Lancaster, Pennsylvania. Housed in a historic 19th-century tobacco warehouse, the hotel integrates contemporary art into its hospitality experience, featuring rotating exhibitions by regional artists. It is a contributing property to the Harrisburg Avenue Tobacco Historic District, which is listed on the National Register of Historic Places, and is a member of Historic Hotels of America, the official program of the National Trust for Historic Preservation.

The building that now houses the Lancaster Arts Hotel was originally constructed in 1881 as a tobacco warehouse. Developed by Arnold Falk, a New York-based entrepreneur, the warehouse was built to support Lancaster's burgeoning tobacco industry. The structure served this purpose until 1945, after which it was repurposed to house a paper and twine business, as well as an electronics company. In 2006, the warehouse was redeveloped into a boutique hotel, maintaining many of its historic architectural features.

The hotel preserves elements of its industrial past, including exposed brick walls, wooden beams, and original hardwood flooring, while incorporating modern boutique luxury elements. The interior design blends historic preservation with contemporary art, featuring a curated collection of paintings, sculptures, and mixed media from local and regional artists.

The Lancaster Arts Hotel Gallery is a focal point of the property, showcasing over 260 original pieces by 36 local artists working in 15 different mediums. The gallery includes a tribute to Blanche Nevin, a Lancaster-born sculptor best known for her statue of Peter Muhlenberg in the National Statuary Hall Collection at the U.S. Capitol Building. Another space within the hotel highlights works inspired by Charles Demuth, a renowned American modernist painter and Lancaster native. Additionally, past exhibitions have included works by Warren Rohrer and David Brumbach.

Lancaster Arts Hotel features 63 guest rooms, including 12 suites with whirlpool tubs. The hotel offers complimentary high-speed Wi-Fi, free covered parking, and a 24-hour fitness center. Guests can also enjoy the on-site restaurant, John J. Jeffries, which specializes in farm-to-table cuisine featuring locally sourced ingredients.

The hotel is located near Lancaster's city center.
