= Papadatos =

Papadatos (Greek: Παπαδάτος) is a Greek surname. Notable people with the surname include:

- Alecos Papadatos (born 1959), Greek comic book writer and illustrator
- Dimitrios Papadatos (born 1991), Australian golfer
