= North Shippen–Tobacco Avenue Historic District =

Historic district in Pennsylvania, United States

- N. Shippen–Tobacco Avenue Historic District
- U.S. National Register of Historic Places
- U.S. Historic district
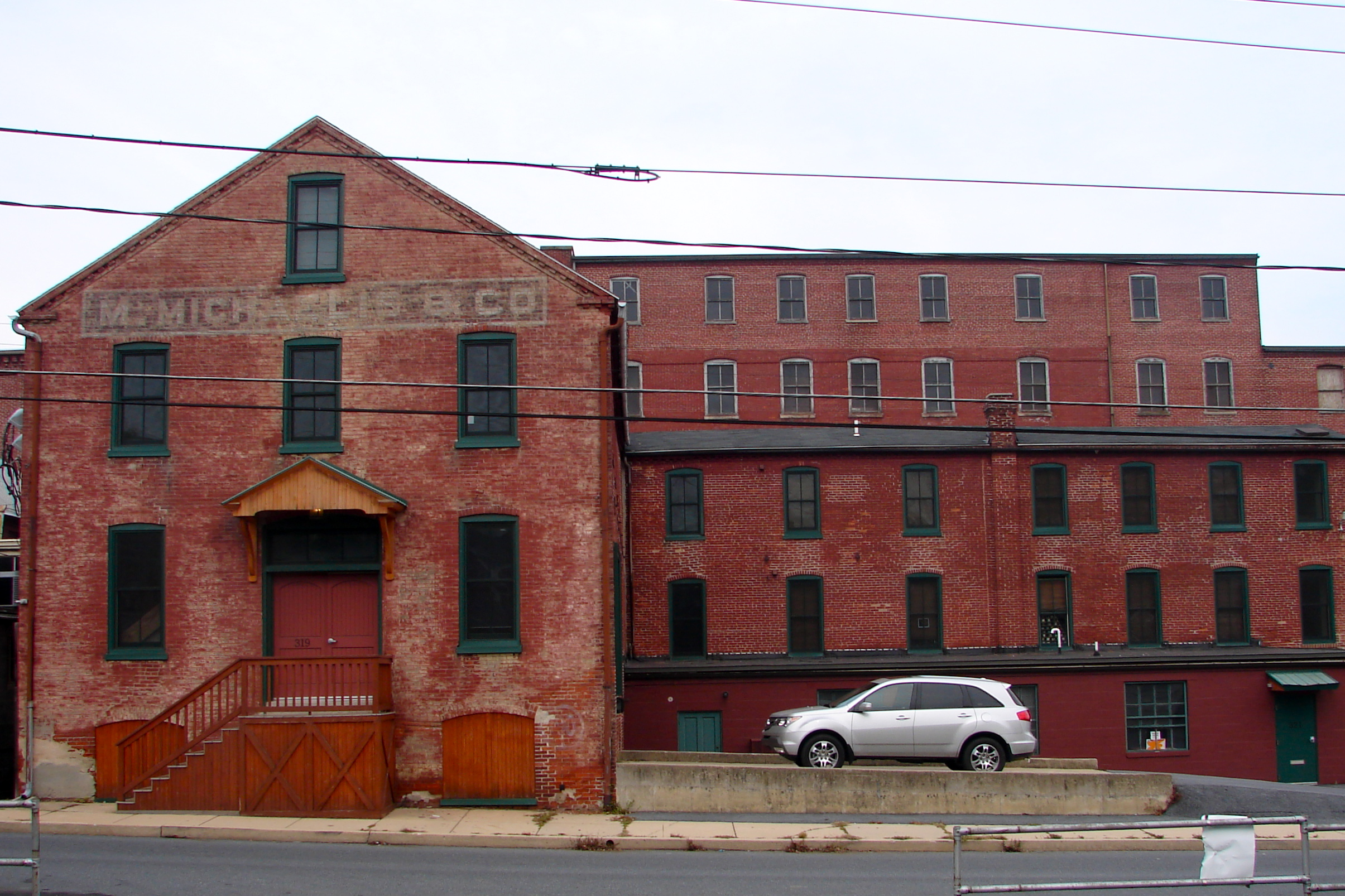
- N. Shippen–Tobacco Avenue Historic District, October 2010

- Location within Pennsylvania Location within the United States
- Location: Roughly bounded by N. Shippen St., Tobacco Ave., and E. Fulton St., Lancaster, Pennsylvania
- Coordinates: 40°2′34″N 76°17′37″W
- Area: 1.5 acres (0.61 ha)
- Built: 1880
- Architectural style: Tobacco Warehouse
- MPS: Tobacco Buildings in Lancaster City MPS
- NRHP reference No.: 90001402
- Added to NRHP: September 21, 1990

The North Shippen–Tobacco Avenue Historic District is an historic cigar factory and tobacco warehouse complex and national historic district located in Lancaster, Lancaster County, Pennsylvania, United States.

They were listed on the National Register of Historic Places in 1990.

== History and architectural features ==
This district includes eight contributing buildings, four of which were previously listed as the A. B. Hess Cigar Factory, and Warehouses. They are the Consolidated Cigar Co., consisting of the M. Oppenheimer and J. Bunzl & Sons warehouses (c. 1880), the J.R. Russel Tobacco Warehouse (c. 1880), and the J. Best Tobacco Warehouse (c. 1880). All four structures are brick buildings that sit on stone foundations; all were used for the processing and storage of cigar leaf tobacco.

== See also ==
- Harrisburg Avenue Tobacco Historic District, Lancaster
- Teller Brothers–Reed Tobacco Historic District, Lancaster
- National Register of Historic Places listings in Lancaster, Pennsylvania
