= Peter Diamandopoulos =

Greek-American university president

4th President of Sonoma State University
- In office 1977–1983
- Preceded by: Marjorie Downing Wagner
- Succeeded by: David W. Benson

7th President of Adelphi University
- In office 1985–1997
- Preceded by: Timothy Costello
- Succeeded by: Igor Webb

Personal details
- Born: September 1, 1928 Iraklion, Crete, Greece
- Died: April 1, 2015 (aged 86) Manhattan, New York, U.S.
- Education: Athens College, Harvard University
- Nickname: Dr. D

Peter Theodore Diamandopoulos (September 1, 1928 – April 1, 2015) was a Greek–American academic administrator. He served as the president of Sonoma State University from 1977 to 1983, when he was forced to resign; followed by serving as the seventh president of Adelphi University from 1985 until his dismissal in 1997, due to the school's financial problems.

== Early life and education ==
He was born in Iraklion, Crete, to Theodore Diamandopoulos and Margarita Mouzenidis. He attended Athens College, then moved to the United States in 1948 to study philosophy at Harvard University.

== Career ==
Diamandopoulos began his academic career at University of Maryland. He moved to Brandeis University, where he was the dean of faculty from 1965 to 1971. Diamandopoulos then chaired the philosophy department for the next four years. From 1969 to 1974, he was the director of studies at the University of Chicago's Adlai Stevenson Institute of International Affairs.

Diamandopoulos was named the president of Sonoma State University in 1977 and served until 1983 when he was forced to resign after continuing controversy including multiple censures and a faculty vote of no confidence.

In 1985, Diamandopoulos was appointed president of Adelphi University. Seeking to improve the school's academic reputation, Diamandopoulos raised tuition and reduced faculty. His own compensation package remained unaffected by cuts and included a Mercedes-Benz, a condominium in Manhattan, and the presidential residence on the Adelphi campus. An investigation of the school's finances showed that it was a customer of the insurance company run by Ernesta G. Procope, who also served as the head of Adelphi's board. For this conflict of interest, she, Diamandopoulos, and sixteen other members of the board were removed from their posts. A week later, a newly appointed board removed Diamandopoulos from the office of president. He sued Adelphi University, and settled for $1.4 million.

In December 1998, Diamandopoulos was named special assistant to John Silber, the president of Boston University. He retired in 2008, and died in Manhattan on April 1, 2015.
