= Harrisburg Avenue Tobacco Historic District =

Historic district in Pennsylvania, United States

- U.S. National Register of Historic Places
- U.S. Historic district
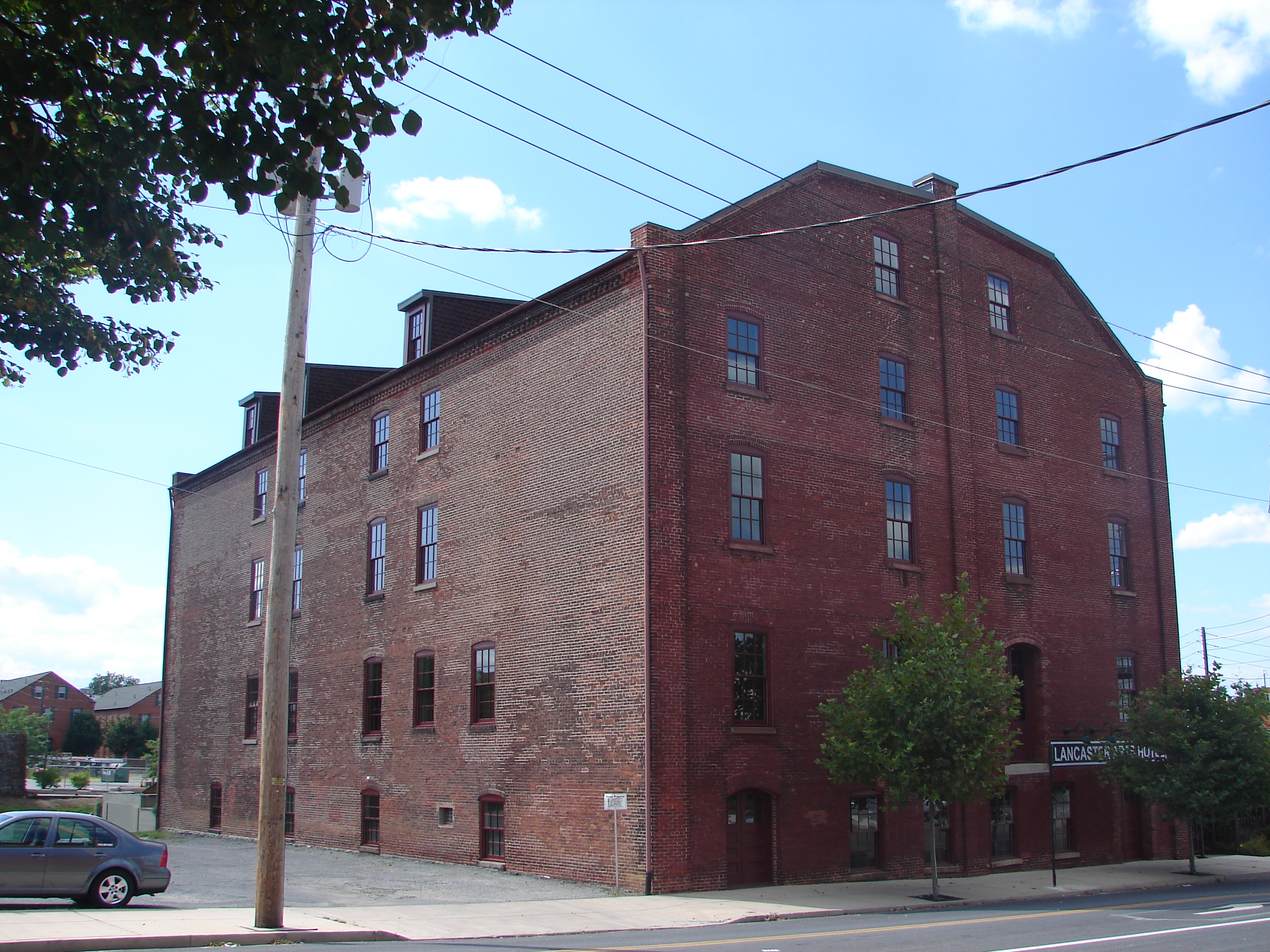
- Lancaster Arts Hotel (Rosenbaum Tobacco Warehouse), August 2011

- Location within Pennsylvania Location within the United States
- Location: Harrisburg Ave. at N. Mulberry St., Lancaster, Pennsylvania
- Coordinates: 40°2′47″N 76°18′45″W
- Area: 1.3 acres (0.53 ha)
- Built: 1874–c. 1881
- Architectural style: Tobacco Warehouse
- MPS: Tobacco Buildings in Lancaster City MPS
- NRHP reference No.: 90001393
- Added to NRHP: September 21, 1990

The Harrisburg Avenue Tobacco Historic District is an historic tobacco warehouse complex and national historic district in Lancaster, Pennsylvania.

It was listed on the National Register of Historic Places in 1990.

== History and architectural features ==
This historic district includes four contributing buildings which were built between 1874 and roughly 1881. All four buildings are brick buildings which were used for the processing and storage of cigar leaf tobacco. Two of the four buildings were built in 1874 and known as the C. August Bitner Tobacco Warehouse. The third was built circa 1880 as the Pritzfield & Co. Tobacco Warehouse, and the fourth was built sometime around 1881 as the Rosenbaum Tobacco Warehouse. The Rosenbaum Tobacco Warehouse is now occupied by the Lancaster Arts Hotel.

== See also ==
- North Shippen–Tobacco Avenue Historic District, Lancaster
- Teller Brothers–Reed Tobacco Historic District, Lancaster
- National Register of Historic Places listings in Lancaster, Pennsylvania
