= My Egypt =

1927 painting by Charles Demuth

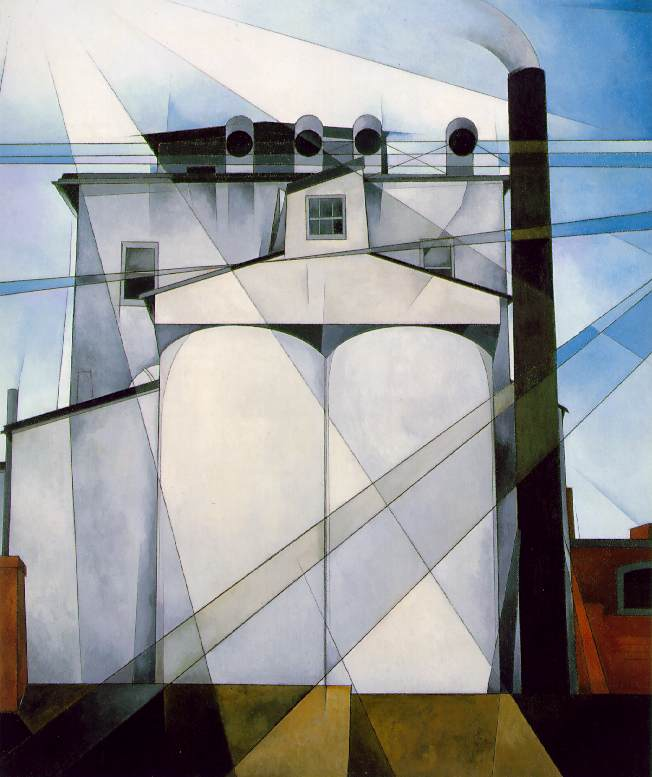
- Artist: Charles Demuth
- Year: 1927
- Medium: oil, chalk, and graphite on composition board
- Dimensions: 91.3 cm × 76.2 cm (35.9 in × 30.0 in)
- Location: Whitney Museum, New York

My Egypt is a 1927 painting by the American artist Charles Demuth. It depicts a grain elevator from the artist's hometown of Lancaster, Pennsylvania, and is considered a "masterpiece" and "emblem" of the Precisionist art movement.

== Background ==
The grain elevator featured in the painting belonged to John W. Eshelman and Sons, and was part of a feed mill located near the center of Lancaster. The concrete silos depicted were constructed in 1919, and are flanked by older brick and timber structures near the lower edge of the painting.

The art historian Emily Farnham notes that Demuth's earlier paintings—especially his 1917 Bermuda landscapes—were characterized by pale colors, while also identifying My Egypt as part of a shift in which the painter's "color came back to life".

== Analysis ==
The art historian Karal Ann Marling finds the Great Pyramid of Giza to be the "primary analogue" to the painting's monumental grain elevator, and interprets the pyramidal elevator to be "Demuth's memorial to himself ... his Egypt, a personal emblem of death constructed in terms of the American monument which dominates the skyline of Lancaster." The Egyptologist I. E. S. Edwards traces the link between pyramids and grain elevators to at least as early as the 5th century, when Julius Honorius attempted to prove that the Egyptian pyramids were Joseph's granaries.
