= Bermuda No. 2, The Schooner =

Drawing by Charles Demuth

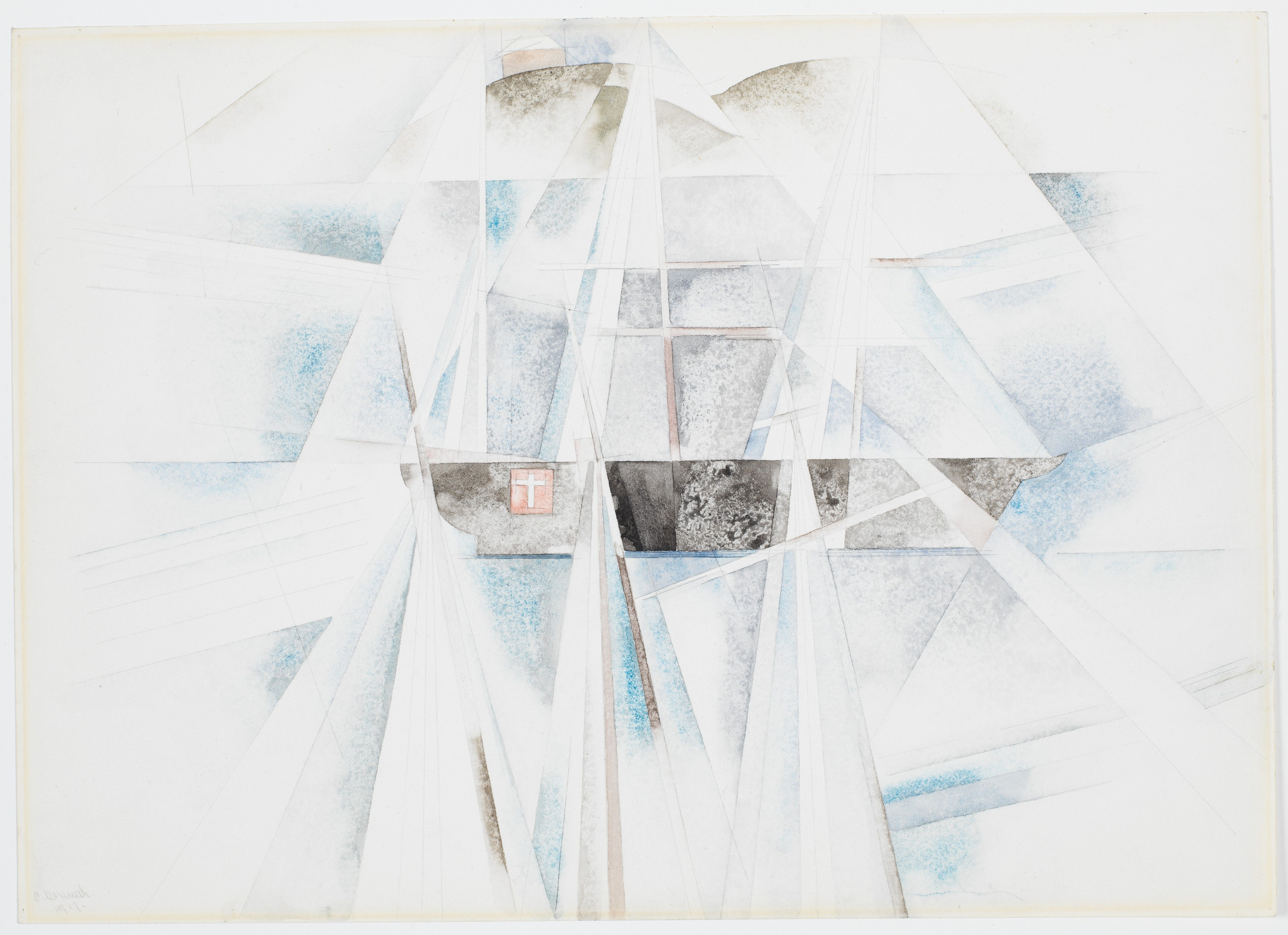
- Artist: Charles Demuth
- Year: 1917
- Medium: Watercolor and graphite on paper
- Subject: Danish ship Elsa
- Dimensions: 25.4 cm × 35.2 cm (10.0 in × 13.9 in)
- Location: Metropolitan Museum of Art; New York

Bermuda No. 2, The Schooner is an early-20th-century drawing by American artist Charles Demuth. Done in watercolor and graphite on paper, the work depicts the ship Danish ship Elsa. The drawing is in the collection of the Metropolitan Museum of Art.

== Description ==
=== History ===
During the fall of 1916, Charles Demuth visited the island of Bermuda, staying until the spring of 1917. An artist who was greatly influenced by the Cubist and Futurist schools, Demuth spent much of his time on Bermuda painting and drawing; the drawings he rendered during this time period are considered to be his Bermuda series of works. These drawings—many of which were landscapes—are considered to be part of Demuth's artistic legacy.

While on Bermuda, Demuth possibly was met and influenced by American modernist painter Marsden Hartley, who was also wintering on Bermuda at the time. It is posited by the Metropolitan Museum of Art's profile of Schooner that Demuth's work may have been influenced by French artist Albert Gleizes, another notable artist who was on Bermuda at the same time as Demuth.

The drawing itself depicts a sailing ship, the Danish-flagged Elsa. (Note: Lloyd's Register of Shipping (1917–18) records Elsa as being a 190ft long vessel of 1236 tons) Some sources describe the ship as a three-masted schooner, while others note that Elsa was a two-masted bark; art curator Magdalena Dabrowski notes that the description of the Elsa as a schooner stems from a 1944 art exhibition at the Philadelphia Museum of Art, and that this description has led to Demuth's work being given the incorrect Schooner title. The Elsa was docked in St. George for repairs during the winter of 1916-1917 and during this time was featured in the art of both Demuth and Hartley, the later of whom painted three works (one titled Elsa) with the ship as his subject.

Demuth's work later came into the collection of the Metropolitan Museum of Art.

=== Drawing ===
The drawing itself heavily features Demuth's Cubo-Futurist proclivities; the work is defined by multiple intersecting lines and planes, while the level form of Elsa's hull is contrasted against the triangular shape of her sails. The Danish flag (a white cross on a red field) can be seen on the hull of the ship.
