= A. B. Hess Cigar Factory, and Warehouses =

- U.S. National Register of Historic Places
- U.S. Historic district – Contributing property
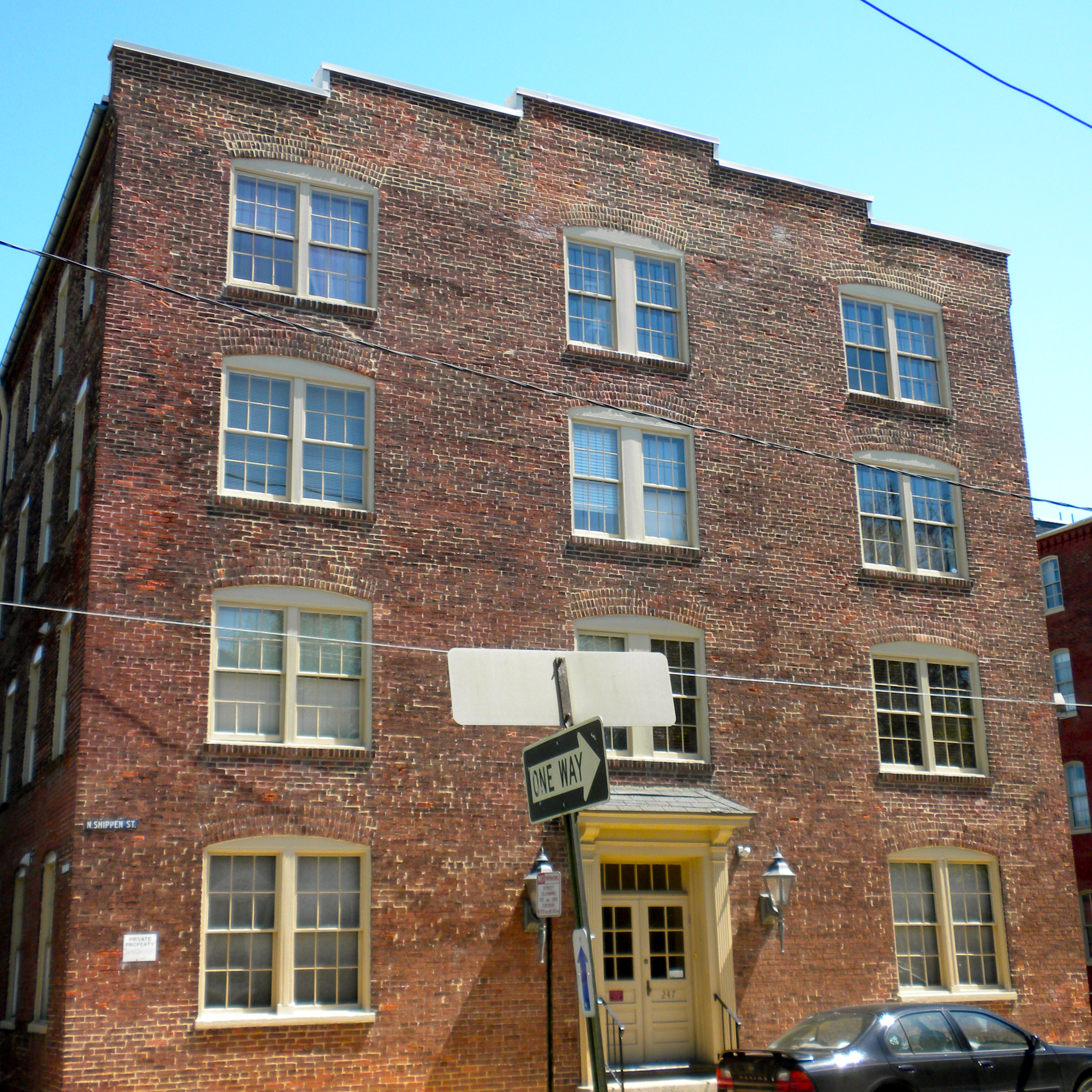
- A. B. Hess Cigar Factory, April 2010

- Location within Pennsylvania Location within the United States
- Location: 231 N. Shippen St., Lancaster, Pennsylvania
- Coordinates: 40°2′38″N 76°17′57″W
- Area: 1 acre (0.40 ha)
- Built: c. 1880-1881, c. 1905-1908
- Part of: North Shippen–Tobacco Avenue Historic District (ID90001402)
- MPS: Tobacco Buildings in Lancaster City MPS
- NRHP reference No.: 82003792

Significant dates
- Added to NRHP: August 24, 1982
- Designated CP: September 21, 1990

A. B. Hess Cigar Factory, and Warehouses is a historic cigar factory and tobacco warehouse complex located at Lancaster, Lancaster County, Pennsylvania. The complex consist of four rectangular red brick buildings, three to five stories tall. They are the R. H. Brubaker Tobacco Warehouse including the Koenig & Co. Warehouse (c. 1880–1881), the Franklin H. Bare Tobacco Warehouse (c. 1880–1881), and the A. B. Hess Cigar Factory (c. 1905–1908). The buildings have been converted to residential use.

It was listed on the National Register of Historic Places in 1982. They are located in the North Shippen-Tobacco Avenue Historic District.
