= Teller Brothers–Reed Tobacco Historic District =

Historic district in Pennsylvania, United States

- U.S. National Register of Historic Places
- U.S. Historic district
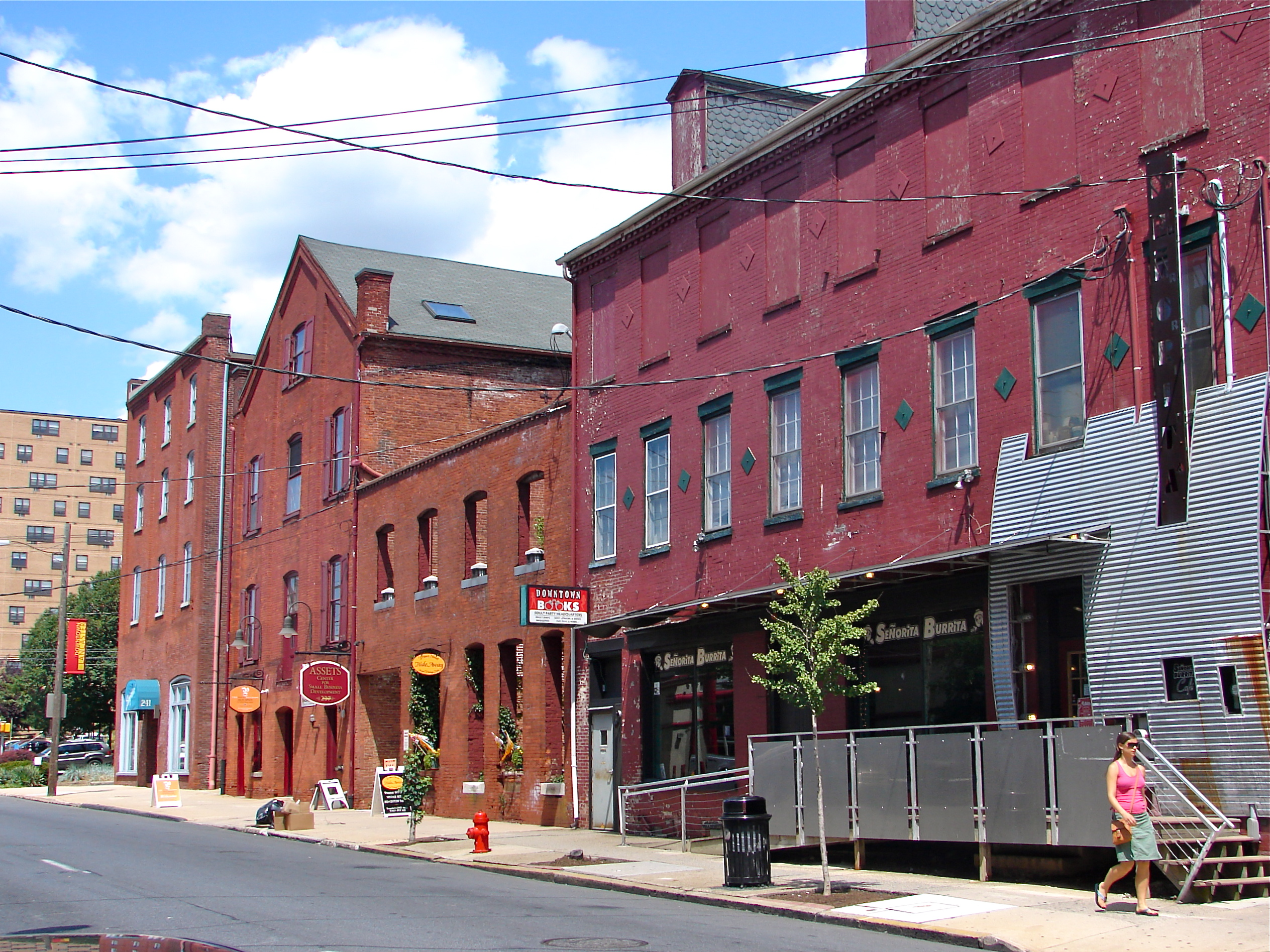
- Teller Brothers–Reed Tobacco Historic District, August 2011

- Location within Pennsylvania Location within the United States
- Location: N. Prince St., 200 block, E side, Lancaster, Pennsylvania
- Coordinates: 40°2′35″N 76°17′38″W
- Area: 1 acre (0.40 ha)
- Built: 1877
- MPS: Tobacco Buildings in Lancaster City MPS
- NRHP reference No.: 90001406
- Added to NRHP: September 21, 1990

The Teller Brothers–Reed Tobacco Historic District is an historic cigar factory and tobacco warehouse complex and national historic district located in Lancaster, Lancaster County, Pennsylvania, United States.

It was listed on the National Register of Historic Places in 1990.

== History and architectural features ==
This district includes five contributing buildings that were built roughly between 1865 and 1900. They are the John F. Reed & Co. Cigar Factory (c. 1865), the J.R. Bitner Tobacco Warehouse (c. 1880), the Lancaster Paint Works (c. 1900), and two warehouses that were built roughly between 1877 and 1885 and were associated with the Teller Brothers operation.

All five buildings are brick buildings that were erected atop stone foundations, are two-and-one-half to four stories tall, and were used for the processing and storage of cigar leaf tobacco.

== See also ==
- Harrisburg Avenue Tobacco Historic District, Lancaster
- North Shippen–Tobacco Avenue Historic District, Lancaster
- National Register of Historic Places listings in Lancaster, Pennsylvania
