= Apostolos Doxiadis =

Greek writer (born 1953)

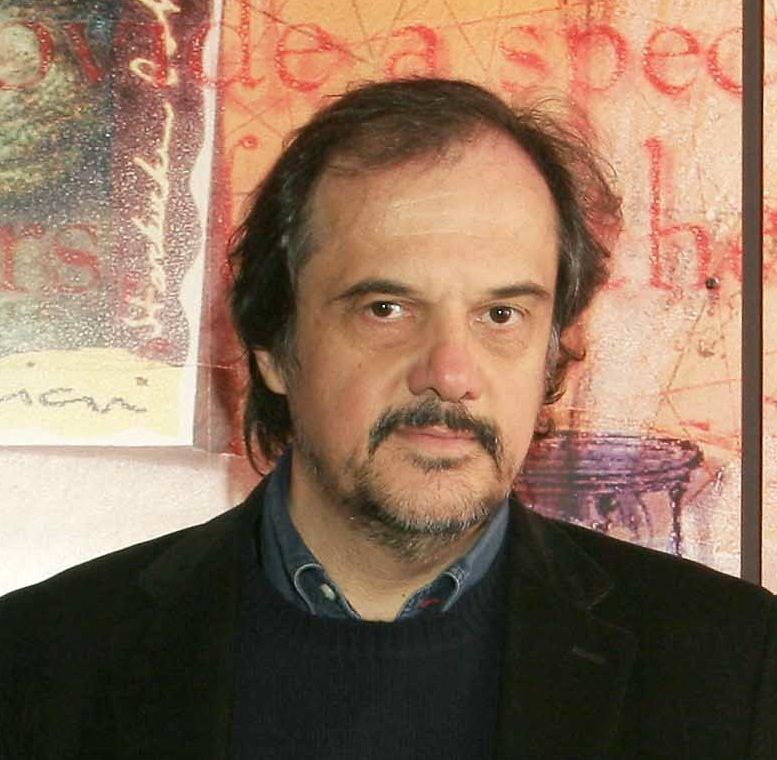
- Athens, 2010
- Born: Apostolos Doxiadis; 6 June 1953 (age 73); Brisbane, Queensland, Australia
- Education: Columbia University; École pratique des hautes études
- Occupation: Writer
- Writing career
- Period: 1983–present
- Genres: Novels, graphic novels, plays
- Notable works: Uncle Petros and Goldbach's Conjecture, Logicomix
- Website: apostolosdoxiadis.com

Apostolos Doxiadis (/dɒksiˈædɪs/; Greek: Απόστολος Δοξιάδης [ðoksiˈaðis]; born 1953) is a Greek writer. He is best known for his international bestsellers Uncle Petros and Goldbach's Conjecture (2000) and Logicomix (2009). Most of Doxiadis’ writing in recent decades has been fiction and essays, but he has also written for the theatre and composed librettos for musicals. In the past, he had also worked as a director in theatre and film.

== Early life ==
Doxiadis was born in Australia, where his father, the architect Constantinos Apostolou Doxiadis was working. Soon after his birth, the family returned to Athens in Greece, where Doxiadis grew up. Though his earliest interests were in poetry, fiction and the theatre, an intense interest in mathematics led Doxiadis to leave school at age fifteen, to attend Columbia University, in New York, from which he obtained a bachelor's degree in mathematics. He then attended the École Pratique des Hautes Études in Paris from which he got a master's degree, with a thesis on the mathematical modelling of the nervous system. Before his father's death from ALS in 1975, the resulting family needs made him return to Greece, interrupting his graduate studies. Soon after addressing the needs, Doxiadis gave all his time to his artistic work.

== Work ==
=== Fiction in English ===
In 1998, Doxiadis translated into English, significantly re-working, his third novel, which was published in England in 2000 as Uncle Petros and Goldbach's Conjecture (UK publisher: Faber and Faber; United States publisher: Bloomsbury USA.) The book became an international bestseller, and has been published to date in more than thirty-five languages. It has received the praise of, among others, Nobel laureate John Nash, British mathematician Sir Michael Atiyah, critic George Steiner and neurologist Oliver Sacks. Uncle Petros is one of the 1001 Books You Must Read Before You Die.

Doxiadis' next project, which took over five years to complete, was the graphic novel Logicomix (2009), a number one bestseller on the New York Times Best Seller list and an international bestseller, already published in over twenty languages. Logicomix was co-authored with computer scientist Christos Papadimitriou, with art work by Alecos Papadatos (pencils) and Annie Di Donna (colour). Renowned comics historian and critic R. C. Harvey, in the Comics Journal, called Logicomix "a tour-de-force" a "virtuoso performance", while The Sunday Times' Bryan Appleyard called it "probably the best and certainly the most extraordinary graphic novel" he has read. Logicomix is one of Paul Gravett's 1001 Comics You Must Read Before you Die.

=== Fiction in Greek ===
Doxiadis began to write in Greek. His first published work was A Parallel Life (Βίος Παράλληλος, 1985), a novella set in the monastic communities of 4th-century CE Egypt, dealing with the conflict between faith and temptation. His first novel, Makavettas (Μακαβέττας, 1988), recounted the adventures of a fictional power-hungry colonel at the time of the Greek military junta of 1967–1974. Written in a tongue-in-cheek imitation of Greek folk military memoirs, such as that of Yannis Makriyannis, it follows the plot of Shakespeare's Macbeth, of which the eponymous hero's name is a Hellenized form. Doxiadis next novel, Uncle Petros and Goldbach's Conjecture (Ο Θείος Πέτρος και η Εικασία του Γκόλντμπαχ, 1992), was the first long work of fiction whose plot takes place in the world of pure mathematics research. The novella The Three Little Men (Τα Τρία Ανθρωπάκια, 1998) was later expanded into the longer novel The Three Little Pigs, which reworks motifs from the "Three Little Pigs" fairy tale in a crime narrative, a morality tale set in the world of the Italian Mafia. The novel has appeared in translation, including Spanish as Tres cerditos (Alianza Editorial, 2017), Italian as Tre piccoli porcellini: tre fratelli, un gangster, una maledizione (Bompiani), and German as Des Menschen Wolf (Tropen, 2017).

Doxiadis's upcoming novel, Bluedog (Γαλανόσκυλος), is scheduled for publication on 19 March 2026. Blending realistic and fantastic elements, the narrative alternates between 1990s Greece and the 1940s during the Axis occupation. Thematically, it explores the contrast between modernity and tradition.

=== Non-fiction in Greek ===
In Amateur revolutionary (Ερασιτέχνης επαναστάτης, 2018), an autobiographical narrative described as a "personal myth-history", Doxiadis recounts his life from childhood to early adulthood, focusing on his political formation during the years of the Greek military dictatorship.

He followed his first direct memoir with a work of autofiction, The phone call that never was (Το τηλεφώνημα που δεν έγινε, 2022). The narrative is centered on his first artistic work in his adolescence and the conflict with his father it led to, framed by a contemporary, partly fictional inquiry into the meaning of that work.

=== Theatre and cinema ===
He has written two plays for the theatre. The first was a full-length shadow-puppet play with music and songs, The Tragical History of Jackson Pollock, Abstract Expressionist (1999), in English, of which he also designed and directed the Athens performance.The music is By Dimitris Papadimitriou. In this play, Doxiadis realized some of his views on "epic theatre", in other words, a theatre based on storytelling, also influenced by the techniques of Greek shadow theatre Karagiozis, the Japanese puppet theatre Bunraku and other traditional Asian forms. His second play, Incompleteness (2005), is an imaginary account of the last seventeen days in the life of the great logician Kurt Gödel, which Gödel spent in a Princeton, New Jersey, hospital, refusing to eat out of fear that he was being poisoned. The play was staged in Athens in 2006 as Dekati Evdomi Nyhta (Seventeenth Night) with the actor Yorgos Kotanidis in the role of Kurt Gödel.

In the early stages of his career, before focusing full-time on writing, Doxiadis worked in professional theatre in Athens as a director and translator, translating among other plays Shakespeare's Hamlet and Eugene O’Neill’s Mourning Becomes Electra. For the Greek National Theatre, he also translated and adapted, in a mixed form of prose and songs, Shakespeare's A Midsummer Night's Dream, with music by Dimitris Papadimitriou.

Doxiadis has also written and directed two feature-length films, in Greek, Underground Passage (Υπόγεια Διαδρομή, 1983) and Terirem (Τεριρέμ, 1987). The latter won the CICAE (International Confederation of Art Cinemas) prize for Best Film in the 1988 Berlin International Film Festival.

=== Scholarship ===
Doxiadis has an intense interest in logic, cognitive psychology and rhetoric, as well as the theoretical study of narrative. In 2007, he organized, with mathematician Barry Mazur, a meeting on the theoretical investigation of the relationship of mathematics and narrative, whose proceedings were published as Circles Disturbed: The Interplay of Mathematics and Narrative (2012). Doxiadis has lectured extensively on his theoretical interests. Doxiadis' recent work has led him to formulate a theory about the development of deductive proof in classical Greece, which lays emphasis on influences from pre-existing patterns in narrative and, especially, Archaic Age poetry.

Doxiadis traces the origins of deductive mathematical proof in classical Greece, arguing that rhetorical concepts—particularly forensic rhetoric shaped by narrativity and forms of poetic storytelling—affected both the macrostructure and microstructure of early Greek proofs.

== Public commentary and political engagement ==
=== Military dictatorship period ===
In his autobiographical work Amateur revolutionary (Ερασιτέχνης επαναστάτης, 2018), Doxiadis describes in detail his involvement in the resistance to the Greek junta (1967–1974) through his participation in the clandestine anti-dictatorship cell of the student organisation associated with the Communist Party of Greece (Interior). In his memoir he adopts a critical perspective on aspects of the Greek Left, including bureaucracy and doctrinaire communist politics.

=== Greek financial crisis ===
During the Greek financial crisis, Doxiadis intervened in public debate through essays and opinion pieces. In an article published immediately after the 2015 Greek bailout referendum, he criticized what he described as populist narratives and misinformation surrounding the vote. In a 2016 lecture at Oxford University's South East European Studies programme (SEESOX), Doxiadis argued that a strand of Greek public intellectuals of the political centre, of which he was one, coalesced around opposition to populism and support for the European project during the period 2012–2015.

=== The case of the eight Turkish officers ===
After the failed coup attempt in Turkey in July 2016, eight Turkish military personnel flew to Greece by helicopter and applied for asylum. In December 2016, an Athens court approved extradition for three of the eight, a decision subsequently challenged in Greece’s judicial process. Greece’s Supreme Court (Areios Pagos) later ruled in January 2017 against extraditing the eight, citing concerns about fair-trial guarantees in Turkey.

The asylum process continued through administrative proceedings. In 2018, the Council of State (Greece’s highest administrative court) upheld the refugee status of one of the servicemen, rejecting the government’s arguments against granting protection. Reuters reporting in 2018 described asylum being granted to one of the group by a Greek committee, while noting that court decisions on extradition were based on fair-trial concerns. Reuters reporting in 2019 referred to the eight as having been granted asylum in Greece.

During the proceedings, Doxiadis publicly intervened with opinion pieces in the Greek press, opposing extradition and arguing for the officers' protection. Writing in Athens Voice, Ireni Agapidaki noted that Doxiadis "shouldered the burden" of the defense of the eight officers in the public sphere. He also wrote on the case in the international press, including an op-ed in The Wall Street Journal on the rule-of-law implications for Europe. In March 2018, he was examined as a witness in appellate-court proceedings concerning an extradition request. Writing in The Guardian, columnist Nick Cohen described Doxiadis, for his role in the case, as a "Greek Zola".

=== Protection of unaccompanied minors ===
In November 2019, Prime Minister Kyriakos Mitsotakis announced the programme “No Child Alone” (Κανένα παιδί μόνο) for the care of unaccompanied children in Greece and appointed Irene Agapidaki as national coordinator, with Doxiadis named as a representative of civil society.

=== Other advocacy ===
In 2019, during a high-profile extradition case involving an Iranian woman and her young daughter, Doxiadis publicised the case and called for support. He also appeared as a witness for her defence in the Supreme Court. The Supreme Court overturned an extradition order in the case, citing risks upon return.

=== Political views ===
In a 2025 public conversation, Doxiadis said, "The left-wingers call me right-wing, while the right-wingers call me left-wing." He described himself as “a liberal”, while distinguishing this from “neoliberalism”. In terms of social welfare and justice, he described himself as "center-left".

=== Thales + Friends ===
Doxiadis is a co-founder of THALES + FRIENDS (ΘΑΛΗΣ + ΦΙΛΟΙ), a Greece-based, volunteer non-profit initiative founded in 2005 that supports the creation of reading groups (including school-based groups) and related activities exploring links between mathematics/science and narrative.

== Awards and honours ==
For Uncle Petros and Goldbach's Conjecture, Doxiadis was the first recipient of the Premio Peano and short-listed for the Prix Médicis. For Logicomix he has earned numerous awards, among them the Bertrand Russell Society Award, the Royal Booksellers Association Award (the Netherlands), the New Atlantic Booksellers Award (US), the Prix Tangente (France), the Premio Carlo Boscarato (Italy), the Comicdom Award (Greece). It was chosen as "Book of the Year" by Time, Publishers Weekly, The Washington Post, The Financial Times, The Globe and Mail, and other publications.
