= Kenneth Steiglitz =

American professor (born 1939)

- Education: New York University
- Awards: IEEE and ACM Fellow
- Scientific career
- Fields: Computer science
- Workplaces: Princeton University
- Thesis: The General Theory of Digital Filters with Applications to Spectral Analysis (1963)
- Doctoral advisor: Sheldon Shou-Lien Chang
- Doctoral students: Christos Papadimitriou, Leah Jamieson
- Website: www.cs.princeton.edu/~ken/

Kenneth Steiglitz is a Eugene Higgins Professor of Computer Science at Princeton University. He was born in Weehawken, New Jersey on January 30, 1939. He received his Doctor of Engineering Science from New York University in 1963. In 1997 he was inducted as a Fellow of the Association for Computing Machinery.

Steiglitz has been teaching at Princeton University since 1963. His current research interests include Alternative models of computation, computing with solitons; auction theory and applications, agent-based market simulation. He is Director of the Program in Applications of Computing.

Steiglitz is a Fellow of the IEEE and ACM and has received numerous awards. In June 2007, he was named Eugene Higgins Professor of Computer Science.

In 2018 he was named a Senior Scholar at Princeton.

== Bibliography ==
- Introduction to Discrete Systems, John Wiley, New York, New York, 1974.
- A DSP Primer, with Applications to Digital Audio & Computer Music, Prentice-Hall, Englewood Cliffs, New Jersey, 1996.
- Combinatorial Optimization: Algorithms and Complexity (with C. H. Papadimitriou), Prentice-Hall, Englewood Cliffs, New Jersey, 1982 (& 1998)
- Snipers, shills, & sharks: eBay and human behavior, Princeton University Press, 2007.
- The Discrete Charm of the Machine: Why the World Became Digital, Princeton University Press 2019
- https://www.universitypressbooks.com/book/9780691179438
