= Charles Duncan (artist) =

American avant-garde painter

Charles W. Duncan (1887–1970) was an American avant-garde painter in the circle of artists that gathered around the photographer and art promoter Alfred Stieglitz. He is now known primarily as the subject of one of Charles Demuth's famous poster portraits.

== Biography ==
Born in New York City to Mary Dolan and William Henry Duncan, Charles Duncan was described in the July 1914 issue of Camera Work as being “a sign painter and painter.” His Social Security application in 1936 states that he was then employed by the General Outdoor Advertising Company in the Bronx, New York. However, letters that Duncan donated to the Smithsonian Institution upon the death of his close friend, John Marin, indicate that Duncan was active as a painter until at least the late 1940s.

Alfred Stieglitz was a supporter of Duncan's work. He presented Duncan's artworks to the public at his gallery, named 291, from May to July 1916. Duncan was among Stieglitz's friends whom he invited to write articles discussing what 291 meant to them for the July 1914 issue of Camera Work. It was Duncan who introduced Marcel Duchamp to Stieglitz. Duncan helped Duchamp procure the infamous urinal submitted as Fountain to the exhibition of the Society of Independent Artists in 1917 and contributed a poem to Duchamp's short-lived Dadaist magazine, The Blind Man. Between 1921 and 1924, five of Duncan's paintings were displayed as part of the Independents Exhibition.

Correspondence found in 1998 reveals a long-running romantic relationship between Duncan and another avant-garde artist of the Stieglitz circle, Edith Clifford Williams. This relationship may well be the theme of Demuth's cryptic poster portrait, with the top half representing the off-kilter Duncan and the bottom half representing the proper yet passionate Clifford.

Duncan's only known surviving works in a public collections are an untitled abstract painting held by the Whitney Museum of American Art and Abstraction-Landscape in The Alfred Stieglitz Collection, co-owned by Fisk University, Nashville, Tennessee, and Crystal Bridges Museum of American Art, Bentonville, Arkansas.
