= Charles Demuth =

American painter (1883–1935)

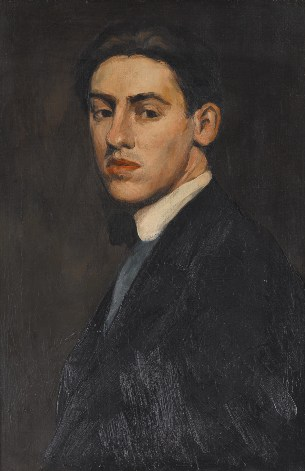
- Self-Portrait, 1907
- Born: November 8, 1883; Lancaster, Pennsylvania, U.S.
- Died: October 23, 1935 (aged 51); Lancaster, Pennsylvania, U.S.
- Resting place: Lancaster Cemetery, Lancaster, Pennsylvania, U.S.
- Known for: Watercolor, Painting
- Movement: Precisionism

Charles Henry Buckius Demuth (November 8, 1883 – October 23, 1935) was an American painter who specialized in watercolors and turned to oils late in his career, developing a style of painting known as Precisionism.

"Search the history of American art," wrote Ken Johnson in The New York Times, "and you will discover few watercolors more beautiful than those of Charles Demuth. Combining exacting botanical observation and loosely Cubist abstraction, his watercolors of flowers, fruit and vegetables have a magical liveliness and an almost shocking sensuousness."

Demuth was a lifelong resident of Lancaster, Pennsylvania. The home he shared with his mother is now the Demuth Museum, which showcases his work. He graduated from Franklin & Marshall Academy before studying at Drexel University and at Philadelphia's Pennsylvania Academy of Fine Arts. While he was a student at PAFA, he participated in a show at the academy, and also met William Carlos Williams at his boarding house. The two were fast friends and remained close for the rest of their lives.

He later studied at Académie Colarossi and Académie Julian in Paris, where he became a part of the avant garde art scene. The Parisian artistic community was accepting of Demuth's homosexuality. After his return to America, Demuth retained aspects of Cubism in many of his works.

== Early life, family and education ==
Charles Demuth was born on 8 November 1883 in Lancaster, Pennsylvania. In 1889, when Demuth was 6 years old, his family moved to an 18th-century house at 120 East King Street. During the colonial period, the house had been a tavern. Demuth's Tobacco Shop, owned and run by his family since 1770, was next door. Demuth lived at the house with his mother Augusta for the rest of his life. He maintained a small studio on the second floor.

Demuth attended Franklin and Marshall College and later pursued graduate study in art in Philadelphia, Pennsylvania.

Demuth either suffered an injury when he was four years old, or may have had polio or tuberculosis of the hip, leaving him with a marked limp and requiring him to use a cane. He later developed diabetes and was one of the first people in the United States to receive insulin as a treatment. Demuth pronounced his surname with emphasis upon the first syllable, earning him the nickname "Deem" among close friends. From 1909 onward, Demuth maintained a romantic relationship with Robert Evans Locher, an Art Deco interior decorator and stage designer.

== Career ==
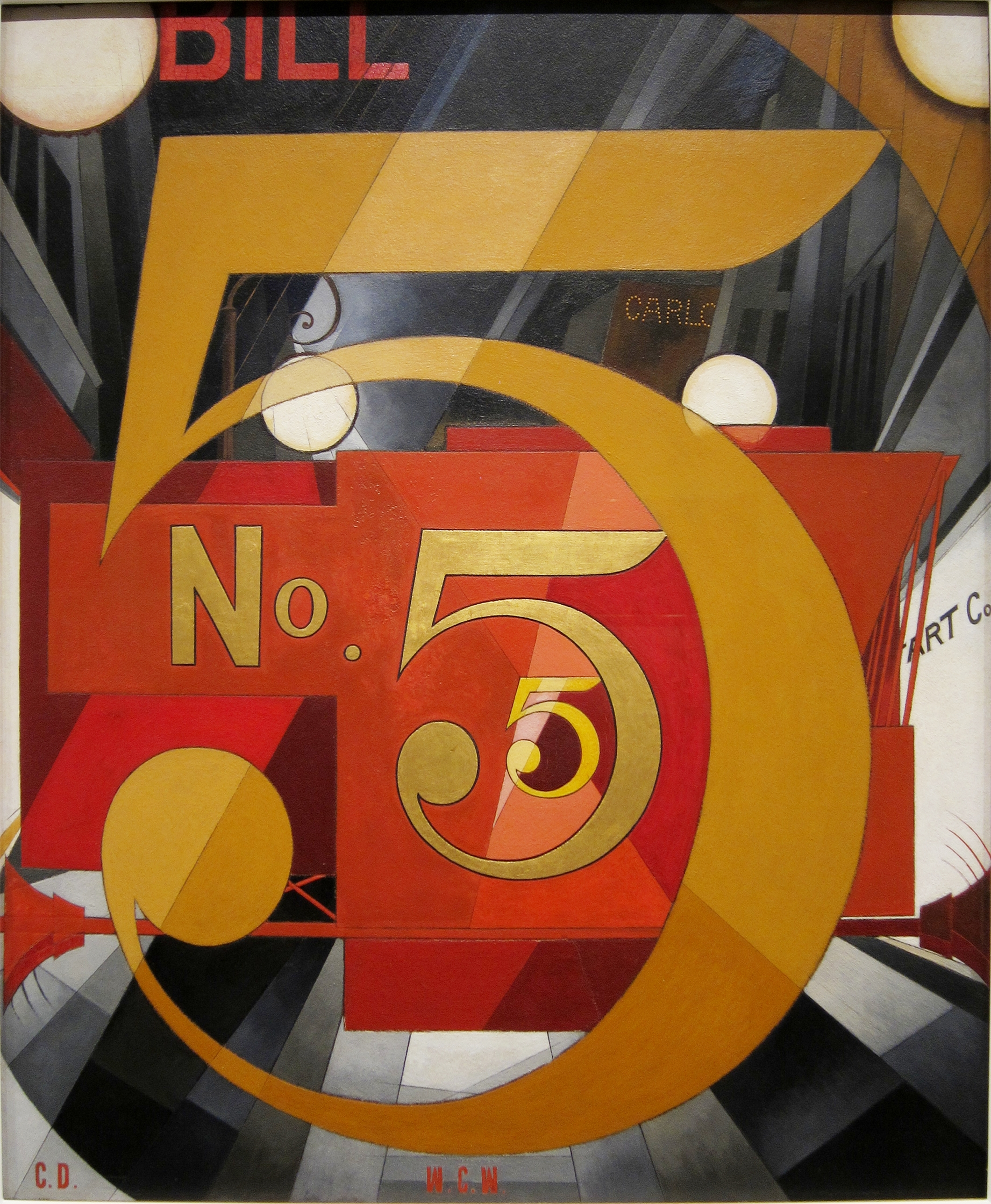
I Saw the Figure 5 in Gold 1928, collection of the Metropolitan Museum of Art, New York City

Throughout his career, Demuth remained deeply attached to Lancaster. The city's modest commercial and civic architecture was the subject of hundreds of his watercolors and paintings. His depictions of warehouses, factories and row houses imbue these ordinary structures (sometimes ironically) with a grandeur and glamor normally associated with cathedrals, palaces and temples. For example, his image of two Lancaster grain silos, titled My Egypt (1927), invites the viewer to compare the massive volumetric forms to pharaonic monuments like the pyramids. In 1907 he painted his first self-portrait in oil.

While in Paris, Demuth met Marsden Hartley by walking up to a table of American artists and asking if he could join them. He had a great sense of humor, rich in double entendres, and they asked him to be a regular member of their group. Through Hartley, he met Alfred Stieglitz and became a member of the Stieglitz group. In 1926, he had a one-man show at the Anderson Galleries and another at Intimate Gallery, the New York gallery run by Stieglitz. Demuth was introduced to modernism during trips to Europe between 1907 and 1921. On frequent trips to New York City, he encountered avant-garde styles and ideas, most notably Cubism, the influence of which is reflected in many of his works.

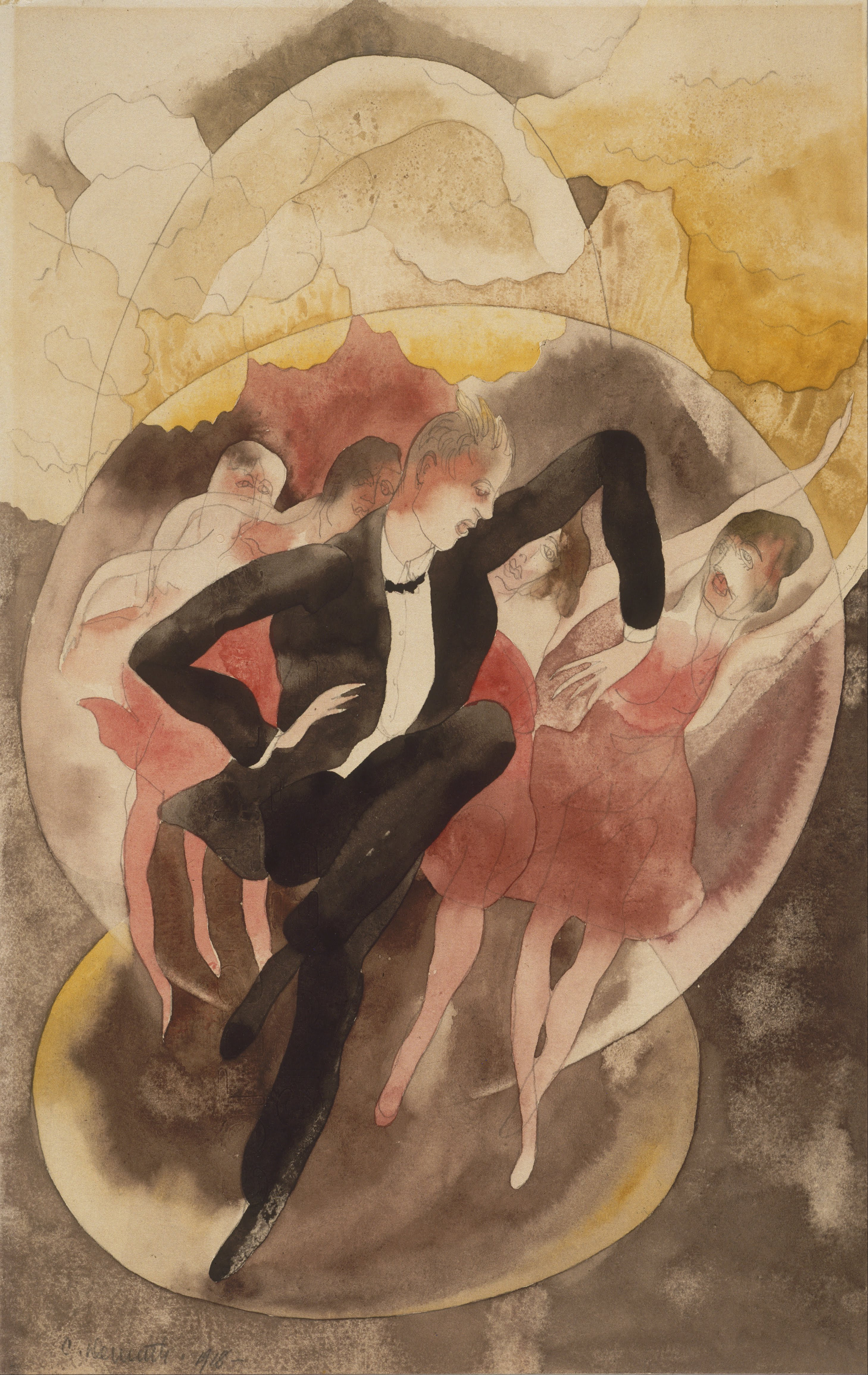
In Vaudeville (Dancer with Chorus), 1918, in the Philadelphia Museum of Art

His most famous painting, I Saw the Figure 5 in Gold, was inspired by his friend William Carlos Williams's poem "The Great Figure". Roberta Smith described the work in The New York Times: "Demuth's famous visionary accounting of Williams, I Saw the Figure Five in Gold, [is] a painting whose title and medallion-like arrangement of angled forms were both inspired by a verse the poet wrote after watching a fire engine streak past him on a rainy Manhattan street while waiting for Marsden Hartley, whose studio he was visiting, to answer his door." Describing its importance, Judith H. Dobrzynski in The Wall Street Journal wrote: "It's the best work in a genre Demuth created, the 'poster portrait'. It's a witty homage to his close friend, the poet William Carlos Williams, and a transliteration into paint of his poem, 'The Great Figure'. It's a decidedly American work made at a time when U.S. artists were just moving beyond European influences. It's a reference to the intertwined relationships among the arts in the 1920s, a moment of cross-pollination that led to American Modernism. And it anticipates pop art."

The work is one of 10 poster portraits Demuth intended to create to honor his creative friends. The six completed ones were in homage to Williams plus Georgia O'Keeffe, Arthur Dove, Charles Duncan, John Marin and Bert Savoy. The others were planned for Marsden Hartley, Gertrude Stein, Eugene O'Neill and Wallace Stevens. Painted during a period of recovery from illness, these paintings portray their respective painters and writers and performers through referential objects and language, as opposed to literal depictions. These works proved to be a challenge for critics. One reviewer described the works as having been made in "a code for which we have not the key."

Demuth, along with Georgia O'Keeffe and Charles Sheeler, was a major contributor to the Precisionist art movement, which began to evolve in America around 1915. Demuth's works often depicted a specific range of forms in a quasi-Cubist, sharply defined manner, a characteristic of Precisionism. Frequently occurring scenes within Demuth's works are urban and rural landscapes, often consisting of industrial features such as bridges, smoke stacks, and skyscrapers. Demuth's "Aucassin and Nicolette," which can be viewed below, is an exemplary work of Precisionist art. Notable features include the highly structured scene lacking figures, depiction of an industrial setting, and sharp linearity created by geometric figures with no hint of abstraction. Demuth's works of this nature have been perceived as ironic and pessimistic in light of their subject matter.

Demuth began a series of paintings in 1919, inspired by the architecture of Lancaster. In creating these works, Demuth opted not to use watercolors, instead created the works in oil and tempera. Additionally, these works are larger than many of his others. They possess a balance between realism and abstraction. In 1927, Demuth started a series of seven panel paintings depicting factory buildings in his hometown. He finished the last of the seven, After All in 1933. Six of the paintings were highlighted in Chimneys and Towers: Charles Demuth's Late Paintings of Lancaster, a 2007 Amon Carter Museum retrospective of his work, displayed in 2008 at the Whitney Museum of American Art. According to the exhibit notes from the Amon Carter show, Demuth's will left many of his paintings to Georgia O'Keeffe. Her strategic decisions regarding which museums received these works cemented his reputation as a major painter of the Precisionist school.

== Later years and death ==
Demuth, a gay artist, was a regular patron at the Lafayette Baths. His sexual exploits there are the subject of watercolors, including his 1918 homoerotic self-portrait set in a Victorian Turkish bath.

Demuth spent most of his life in frail health. By 1920, the effects of diabetes had begun to severely drain Demuth of artistic energy. He died at his residence in Lancaster County, Pennsylvania, at the age 51 of complications from diabetes. He is buried at the Lancaster Cemetery.

== Selected works ==
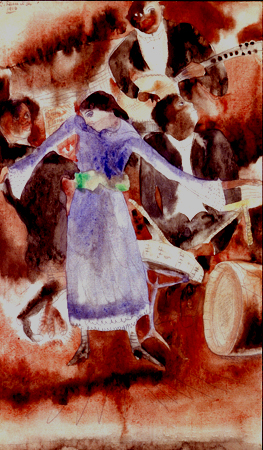
The Jazz Singer (1916)

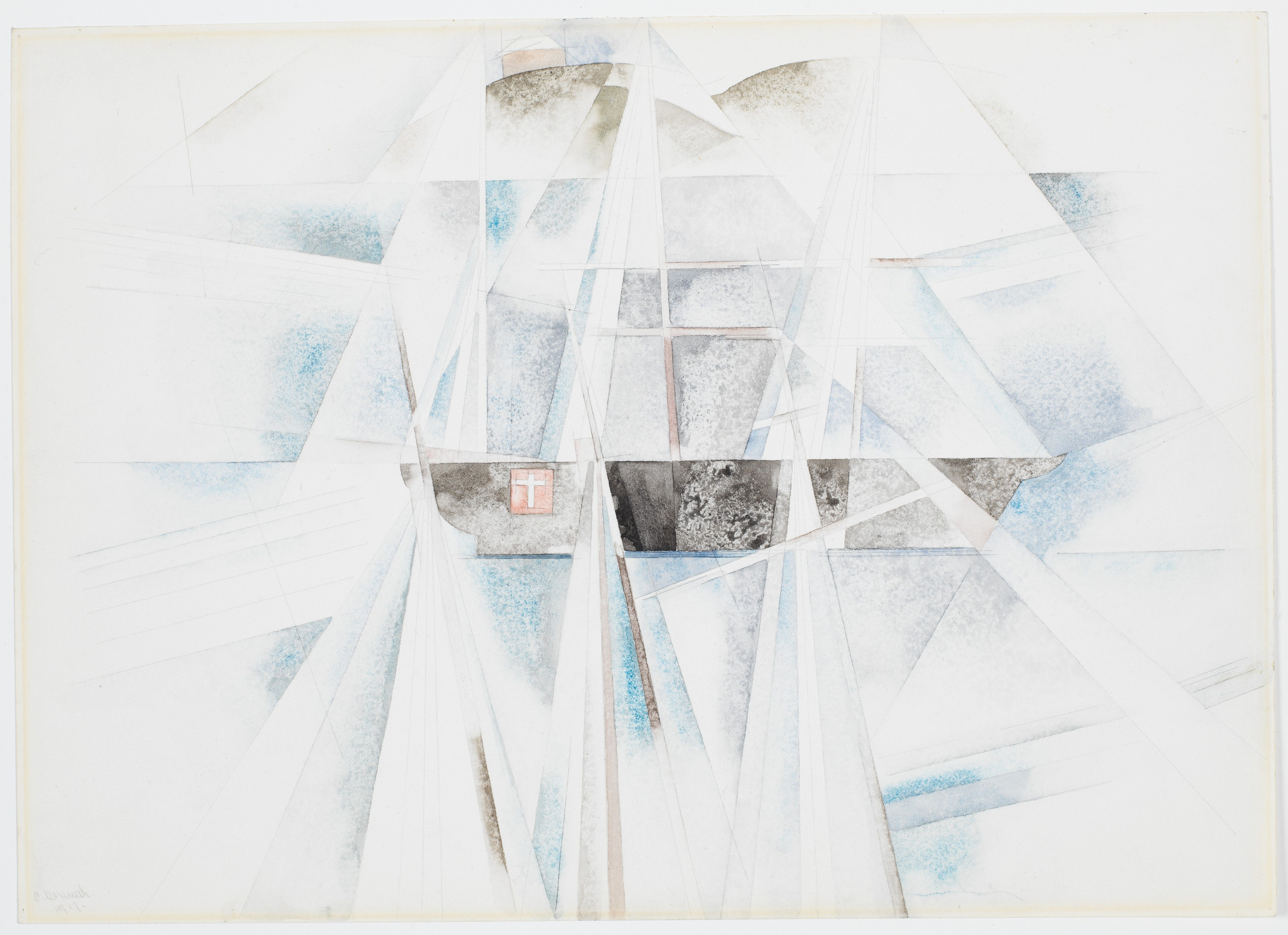
Bermuda No. 2, The Schooner (1917)

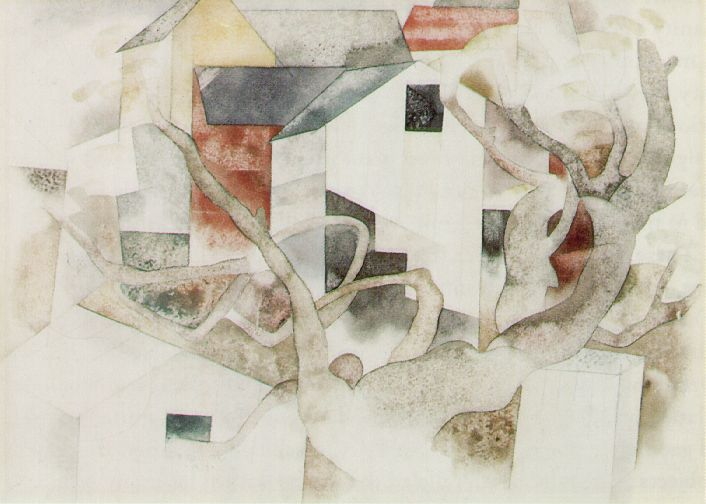
Trees and Barns Bermuda (1917)

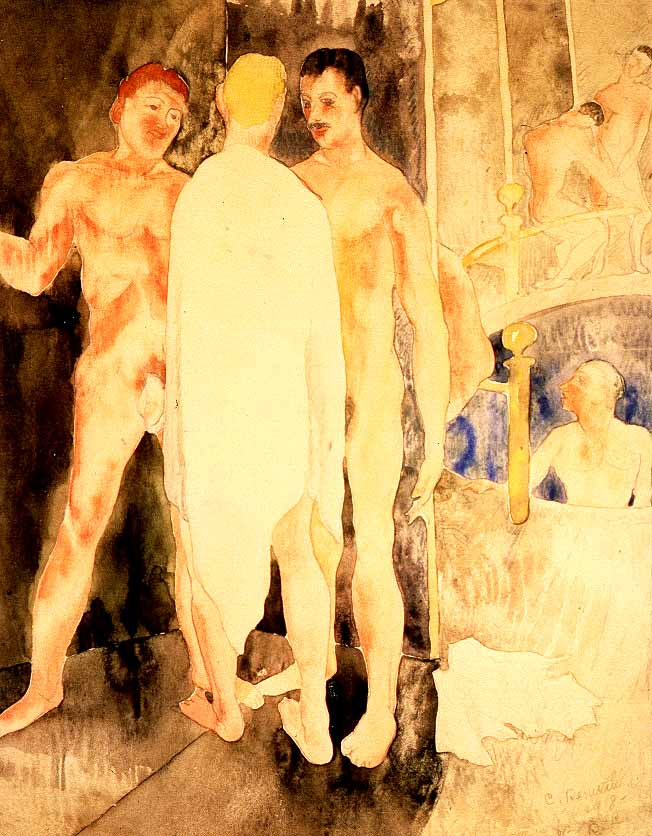
Turkish Bath with Self Portrait (1918)

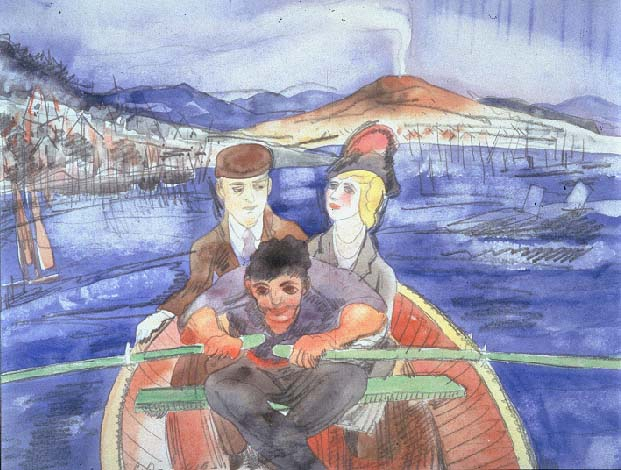
The Boat Ride from Sorrento (1919)

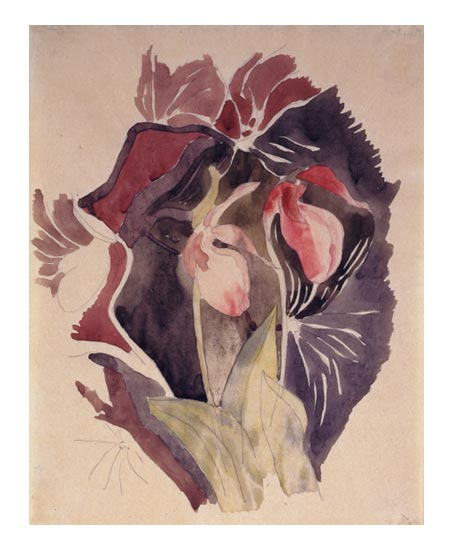
Wild Orchids (1920)

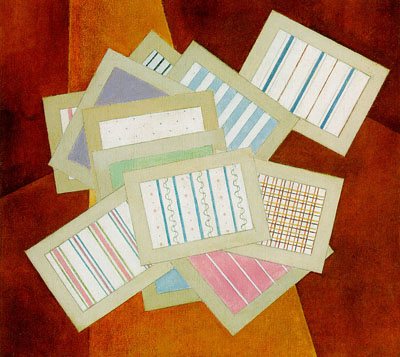
Spring (1921)

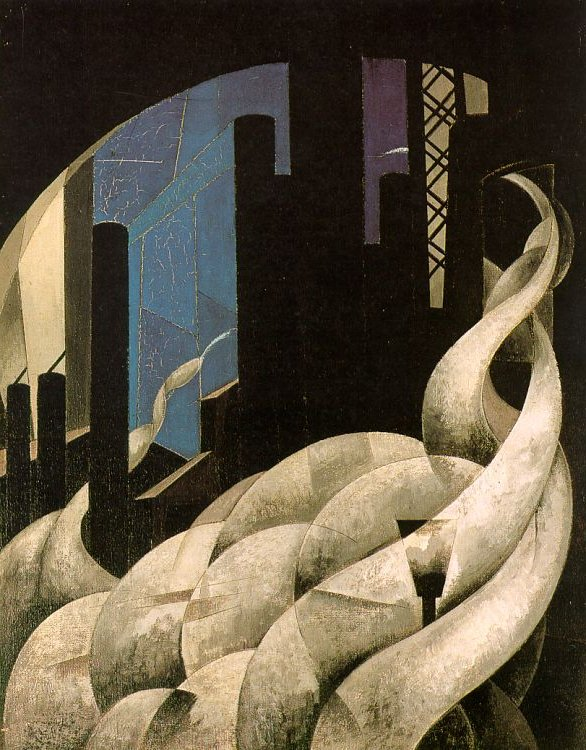
Incense of a New Church (1921)

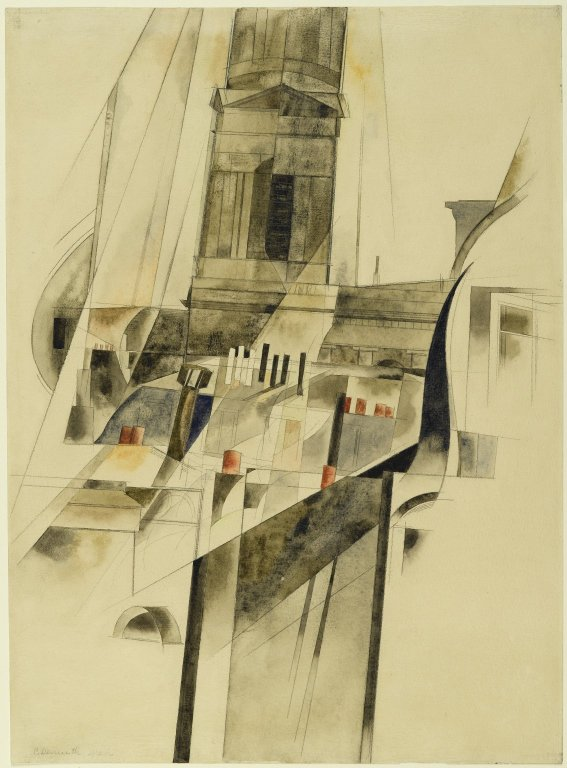
Roofs and Steeple (1921)

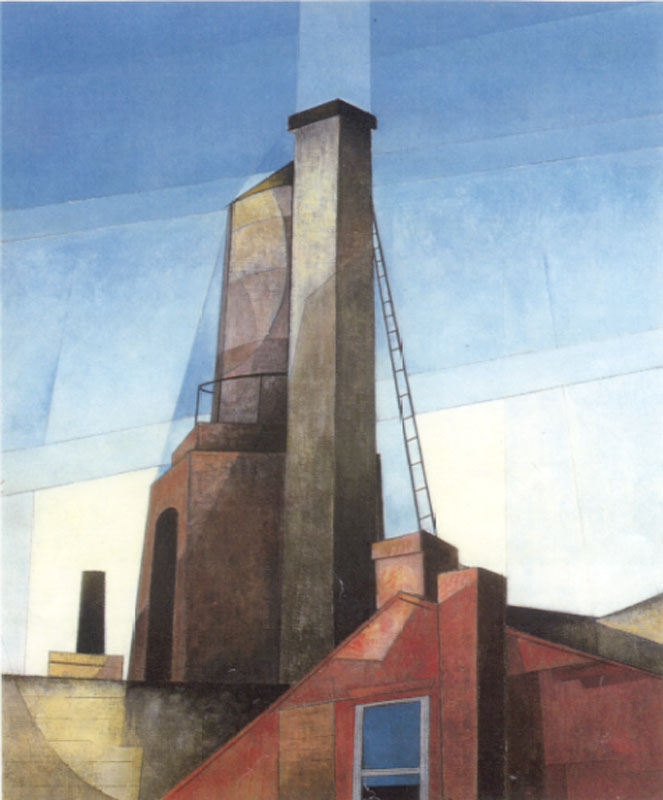
Aucassin and Nicolette (1921)

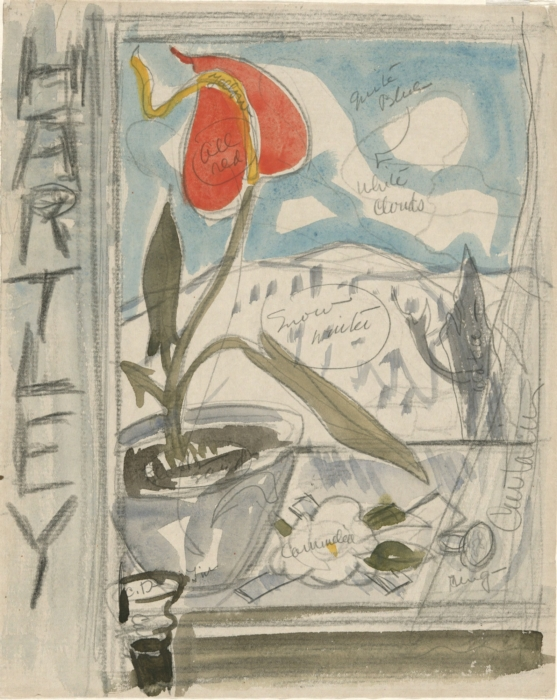
Study for Poster Portrait, Marsden Hartley (1921) (c. 1923–1924)

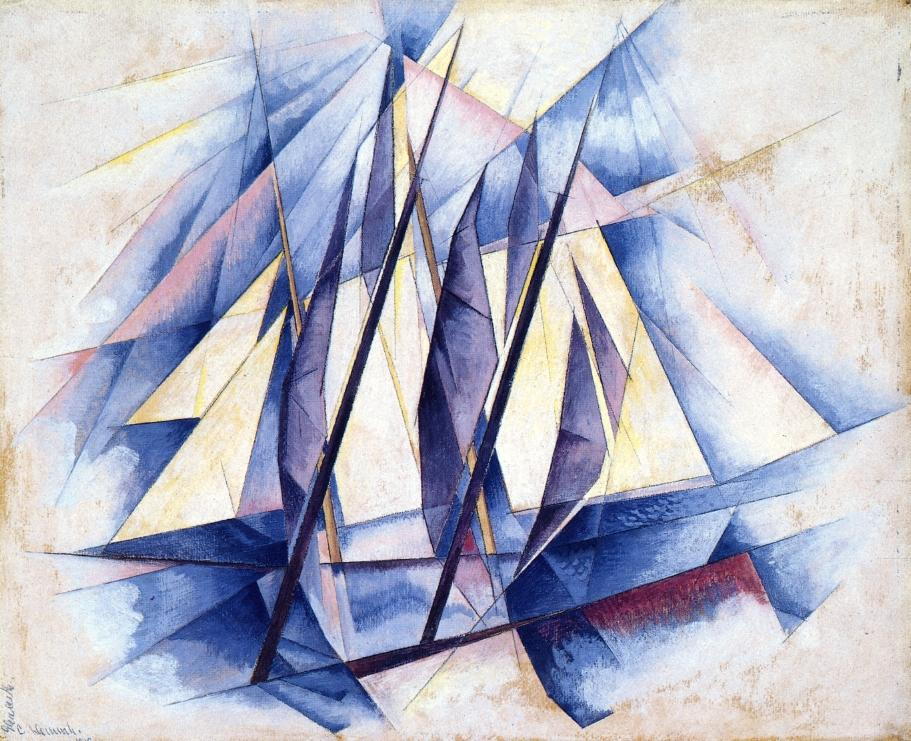
Sail: In Two Movements, 1919

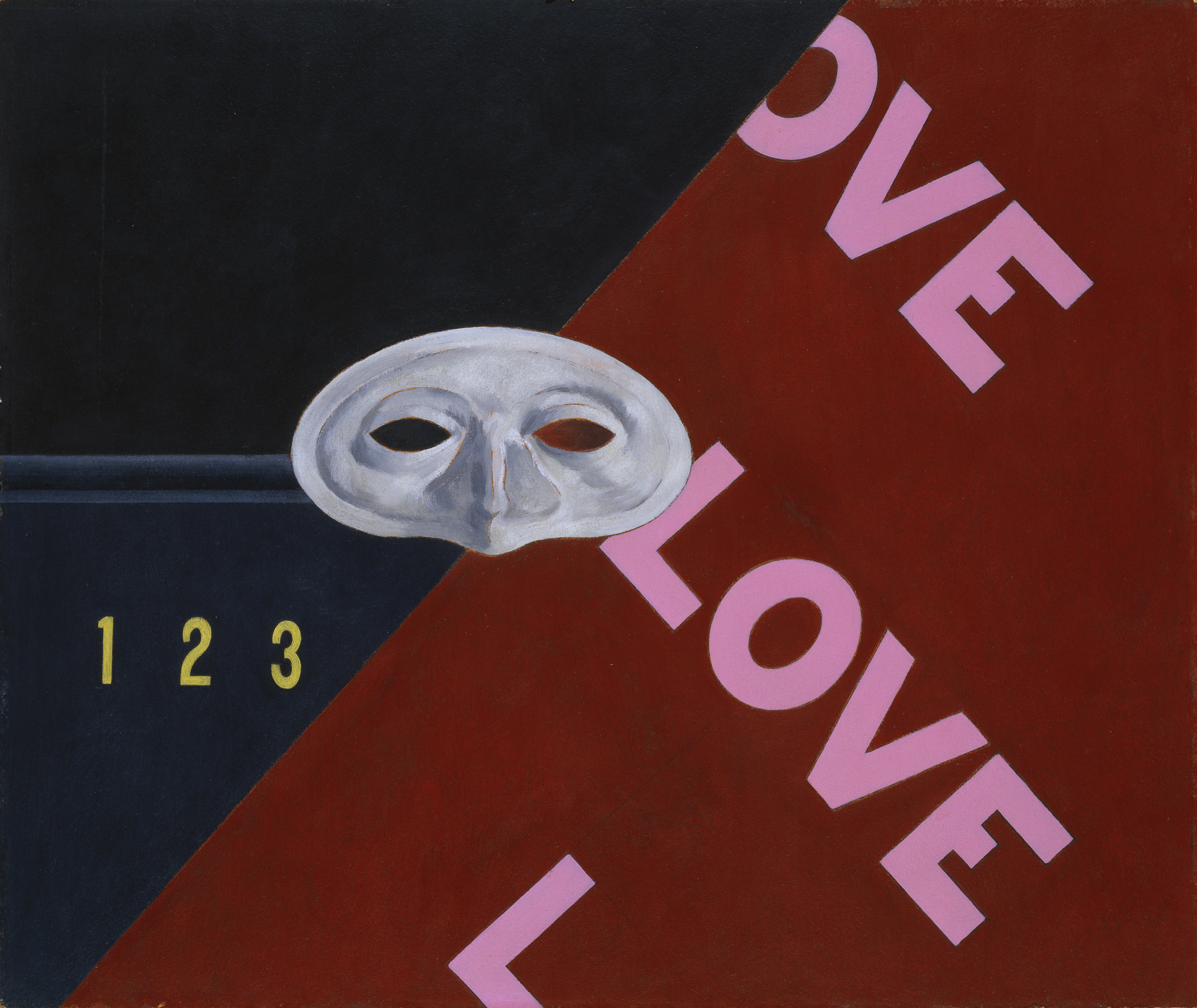
Charles Demuth - Love Love Love, 1928, Museo Thyssen-Bornemisza, Madrid
