= Uncle Petros and Goldbach's Conjecture =

Book by Apostolos Doxiadis

- Author: Apostolos Doxiadis
- Original title: Ο θείος Πέτρος και η εικασία του Γκόλντμπαχ
- Language: Greek
- Genre: Novel, Mathematical fiction
- Publication date: 1992
- English publication date: 2000
- ISBN: 1582341281
- Website: https://www.apostolosdoxiadis.com/book/uncle-petros-and-goldbachs-conjecture/

Uncle Petros and Goldbach's Conjecture is a 1992 novel by Greek author Apostolos Doxiadis. It concerns a young man's interaction with his reclusive uncle, who seeks to prove a famous open conjecture in mathematics, called Goldbach's conjecture, that every even number greater than two is the sum of two primes. The novel discusses mathematical problems and some recent history of mathematics.

== Plot ==
Petros Papachristos, a child prodigy, is brought by his father, a Greek businessman, to the University of Munich (LMU Munich) to verify his genius with Constantin Caratheodory, a Greek-German mathematician. The boy immediately shows an excellent aptitude for mathematics and graduates soon at the University of Berlin (Humboldt University of Berlin). Later he worked as a postdoctoral researcher at the University of Cambridge, where he collaborates with the mathematicians Godfrey Harold Hardy, John Edensor Littlewood and Srinivasa Ramanujan. He is then offered a professorship in Munich, which he accepts because it was far from the great mathematical centres of the time, and it was therefore the ideal place to live in isolation while tackling the Goldbach conjecture.

After years of fruitless work, Petros arrives at an important intermediate result, which he prefers not to disclose in order not to reveal the object of his research and involuntarily help someone else working on the same problem. Later he comes to an even more important result and decides finally to publish it. He sends it to Hardy, whose answer, however, is disappointing: the same discovery had already been published by a young Austrian mathematician. Petros then falls into the deepest depression, taunted by mental exhaustion and the fear that his genius might vanish. Mathematics also begins to enter his dreams, which often turn into nightmares. During a research visit at Trinity College, however, he learns from a young mathematician named Alan Turing of the existence of the incompleteness' theorem by Kurt Gödel.

Returning to Munich, he resumes his work with superficiality, demoralised by the possibility of the unprovability of the conjecture, finding comfort in the game of chess. After a dream he convinces himself that the conjecture is actually unprovable. Before World War II, for political reasons he is repatriated in Greece, and he settles in Ekali, a small town near Athens, where he abandons mathematics and devotes himself to chess.

After years of inactivity he establishes a relationship with his nephew, the narrator, who would like to become a mathematician. He attends university in the United States of America and meets Sammy, with whom he discusses Petros' strange mathematical life. Sammy believes that, as the fox in Aesop's fable The Fox and the Grapes, Petros failed to prove the conjecture and then blamed its unprovability. The nephew switches his studies to economics and then returns home to devote himself to the family business, but often visits his uncle, sharing with him the passion for chess. One day, however, he tries to extrapolate the truth from his uncle and awakens in him again the spirit of the mathematician. In the middle of the night the nephew is awakened by the call from his elderly uncle who claims to have solved the conjecture.

== Publication history ==
The novel was originally published in Greek in 1992 and then translated into English by Doxiadis himself. As a publicity stunt, the English publishers (Bloomsbury USA in the U.S. and Faber and Faber in the UK) announced a $1 million prize for a proof of Goldbach's Conjecture within two years of the book's publication in 2000. As no proof was found, the prize was not awarded.

The cover picture of the original edition is the painting I Saw the Figure 5 in Gold (1928) by Charles Demuth.

== Reception ==
Uncle Petros and Goldbach's Conjecture is one of the 1001 Books You Must Read Before You Die. It was the first recipient in 2000 of the Premio Peano, an international award for books inspired by mathematics, and was short-listed for the Prix Médicis Étranger.
