= Martin Dyer =

British computer scientist

Martin Edward Dyer (born 16 July 1946 in Ryde, Isle of Wight, England) is a professor in the School of Computing at the University of Leeds, Leeds, England. He graduated from the University of Leeds in 1967, obtained his MSc from Imperial College London in 1968 and his PhD from the University of Leeds in 1979. His research interests lie in theoretical computer science, discrete optimization and combinatorics. Currently, he focuses on the complexity of counting and the efficiency of Markov chain algorithms for approximate counting.

== Key contributions ==
Four key contributions made by Martin Dyer are:

1. polynomial time algorithm for approximating the volume of convex bodies (with Alan Frieze and Ravindran Kannan)
2. linear programming in fixed dimensions
3. the path coupling method for proving mixing of Markov chains (with Russ Bubley)
4. complexity of counting constraint satisfaction problems

== Awards and honours ==
In 1991, Professor Dyer received the Fulkerson Prize in Discrete Mathematics (Jointly with Alan Frieze and Ravi Kannan for the paper "A random polynomial time algorithm for approximating the volume of convex bodies" in the Journal of the Association for Computing Machinery) awarded by the American Mathematical Society and the Mathematical Programming Society. In 2021 he was awarded the Godel Prize for the paper "An Effective Dichotomy for the Counting Constraint Satisfaction Problem." SIAM J. Computing. 42(3): 1245-1274 (2013) (Jointly with David Richerby) which is sponsored jointly by the European Association of Theoretical Computer Science and ACM SIGACT. (Other contemporaneous recipients were Andrei Bulatov, Jin-Yi Cai, Xi Chen.)

In 2013, the European Association for Theoretical Computer Science (EATCS) Awards Committee, consisting of Leslie Ann Goldberg, Vladimiro Sassone and Friedhelm Meyer auf der Heide (chair), unanimously decided to give the EATCS Award to Professor Martin Dyer.

== Personal ==
Martin Dyer is married to Alison. They have two adult children.
