= Gérard Cornuéjols =

American mathematician (born 1950)

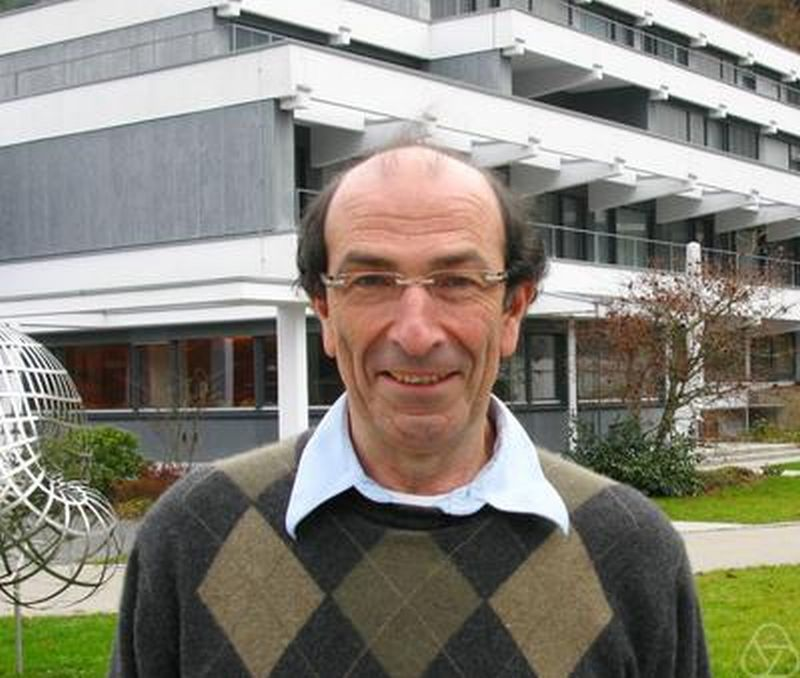
Gérard Cornuéjols, Oberwolfach 2011

Gérard Cornuéjols (born November 16, 1950) is University Professor of Operations Research emeritus in the Carnegie Mellon University Tepper School of Business. His research interests include facility location, integer programming, balanced matrices, and perfect graphs.

== Education and career ==
Cornuéjols graduated from École Nationale des Ponts et Chaussées and earned his Ph.D. in 1978 from Cornell University under the supervision of George Nemhauser, with a dissertation concerning facility location.

Cornuéjols is University Professor of Operations Research emeritus at Carnegie Mellon University's Tepper School of Business. He has also held an academic position at Aix-Marseille University in France. His academic work has focused on mathematical optimization, particularly integer programming and combinatorial optimization.

He served as program chair of the International Symposium on Mathematical Programming held in Pittsburgh in 2015. He was editor-in-chief of Mathematics of Operations Research from 1999 to 2003. He was an invited speaker at the International Congress of Mathematicians in 2002.

== Research ==
Cornuéjols's research focuses on combinatorial optimization, integer programming, mathematical programming, and graph theory. His work includes facility-location problems, polyhedral methods for integer programming, balanced matrices, and perfect graphs. These areas concern the mathematical structure of discrete optimization problems and the development of algorithms for solving them.

His early work on facility location examined optimization models for determining the placement of facilities and the allocation of resources. He later contributed to the study of balanced matrices, a class of matrices with applications in combinatorial optimization. With Michele Conforti and M. R. Rao, he investigated their structural properties and decomposition, work recognized with the 2000 Fulkerson Prize. He also worked on algorithms for identifying balanced matrices and on their connections with integer programming.

Cornuéjols also developed methods for strengthening linear programming relaxations of integer programs. With Egon Balas and Sebastián Ceria, he developed the lift-and-project cutting-plane method for mixed 0–1 programming. Their work addressed the generation of additional constraints to improve the bounds obtained from linear programming relaxations and was later implemented within branch-and-cut solvers. He also worked with Kent Andersen and Yanjun Li on incorporating split cuts into branch-and-bound methods.

Another major area of his research is graph theory, particularly perfect graphs. Cornuéjols studied the strong perfect graph conjecture, which characterizes perfect graphs in terms of the absence of odd holes and their complements. The conjecture was proved in 2002 by Maria Chudnovsky, Neil Robertson, Paul Seymour, and Robin Thomas, following a series of developments in the field.

His research also covers set packing, set covering, vehicle routing, and the traveling salesman problem. Using polyhedral combinatorics, he studied the structure of feasible solutions and methods for improving optimization algorithms. His publications include Combinatorial Optimization: Packing and Covering (2001), Integer Programming (2014), co-authored with Michele Conforti and Giacomo Zambelli, and Optimization Methods in Finance (second edition, 2018), co-authored with Javier Peña and Reha Tütüncü. These books address combinatorial optimization, integer-programming theory, and optimization applications in finance.

== Awards and honors ==
In 1977, Cornuéjols was one of the winners of the Frederick W. Lanchester Prize of the Institute for Operations Research and the Management Sciences (INFORMS).

In 2000, he won the Fulkerson Prize with Michele Conforti and Mendu Rammohan Rao for their work on algorithms for recognizing balanced matrices.

In 2009, the Mathematical Optimization Society gave him their George B. Dantzig Prize.

In 2011, he won the John von Neumann Theory Prize of INFORMS "for his fundamental and broad contributions to discrete optimization including his deep research on balanced and ideal matrices, perfect graphs and cutting planes for mixed-integer optimization".

In 2015, he won the Frederick W. Lanchester Prize for a second time.

In 2016, he was elected a member of the National Academy of Engineering for contributions to the theory, practice, and application of integer programming.

In 2025, he was elected as an INFORMS Fellow.

== Selected publications ==
- Cornuejols, Gerard; Fisher, Marshall L.; Nemhauser, George L. (1977). "Exceptional Paper—Location of Bank Accounts to Optimize Float: An Analytic Study of Exact and Approximate Algorithms". Management Science. 23 (8): 789–810. Bibcode:1977ManSc..23..789C. doi:10.1287/mnsc.23.8.789. ISSN 0025-1909.
- Balas, Egon; Ceria, Sebastián; Cornuéjols, Gérard (1993). "A lift-and-project cutting plane algorithm for mixed 0–1 programs". Mathematical Programming. 58 (1–3): 295–324. doi:10.1007/bf01581273. ISSN 0025-5610.
- Conforti, Michele; Cornuéjols, Gérard; Rao, M.R. (November 1999). "Decomposition of Balanced Matrices". Journal of Combinatorial Theory, Series B. 77 (2): 292–406. doi:10.1006/jctb.1999.1932. ISSN 0095-8956.
- Cornuéjols, Gérard (2001-01-01). Combinatorial Optimization. Society for Industrial and Applied Mathematics. doi:10.1137/1.9780898717105. ISBN 978-0-89871-481-4.
- Cornuejols, Gerard. "the strong perfect graph theorem" (PDF). CMU.
- Cornuéjols, Gérard; Peña, Javier; Tütüncü, Reha (2018-07-27). Optimization Methods in Finance. Cambridge University Press. doi:10.1017/9781107297340. ISBN 978-1-107-05674-9.
- Conforti, Michele; Cornuéjols, Gérard; Zambelli, Giacomo (2014), "Integer Programming Models", Graduate Texts in Mathematics, Cham: Springer International Publishing, pp. 45–84, doi:10.1007/978-3-319-11008-0_2, ISBN 978-3-319-11007-3
