= Luis Nunes Vicente =

Portuguese researcher (born 1967)

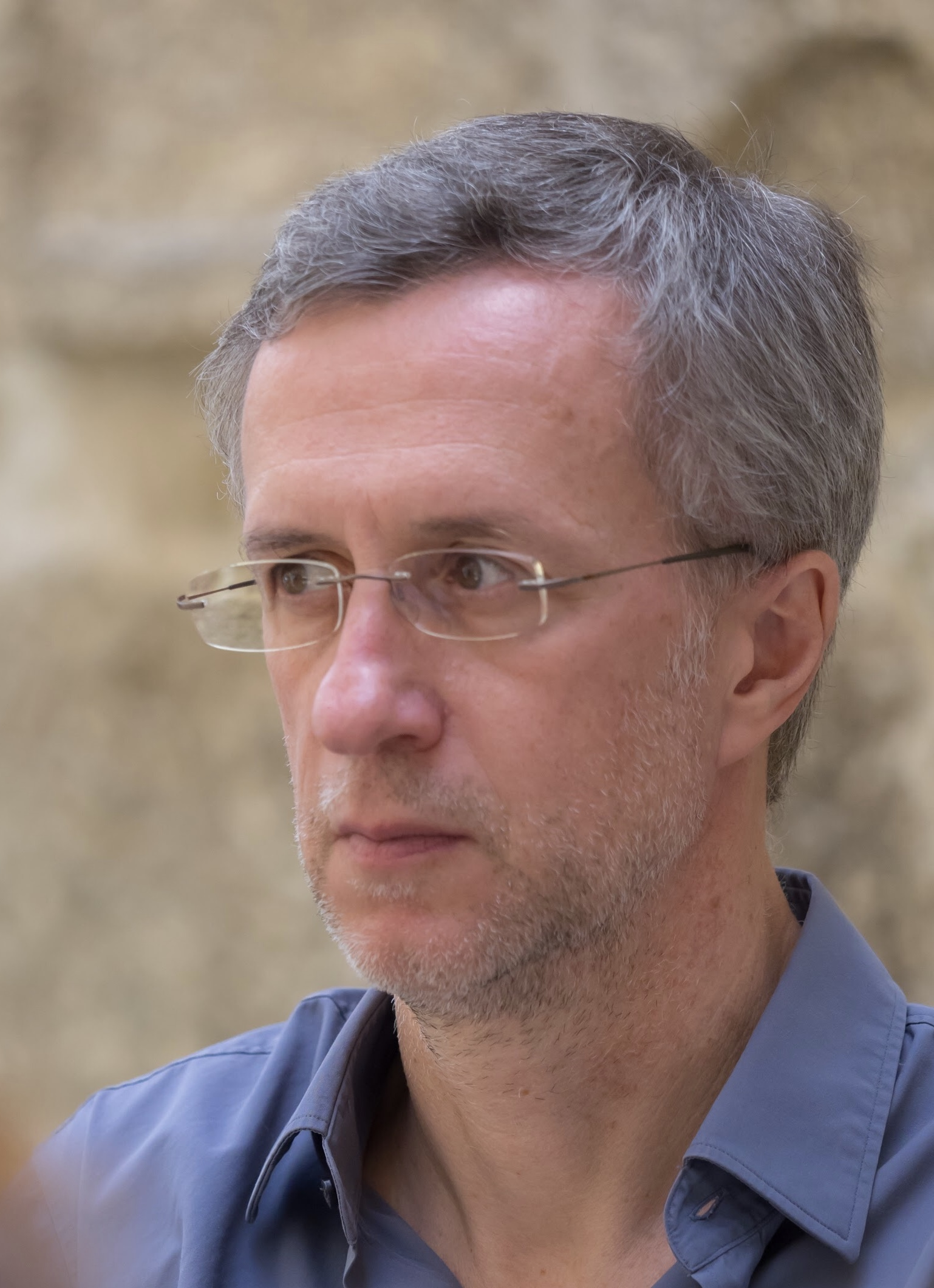
- Born: 1967 (age 58–59); Coimbra, Portugal
- Occupation: Applied mathematician
- Known for: Continuous Optimization and Derivative-Free Optimization
- Awards: Tucker Prize and Lagrange Prize

Academic background
- Education: Rice University
- Thesis: Trust-Region Interior-Point Algorithms for a Class of Nonlinear Programming Problems (1996)
- Doctoral advisor: John Dennis

Academic work
- Notable works: Introduction to Derivative-Free Optimization

Luis Nunes Vicente (born 1967) is an applied mathematician and optimizer who is known for his research work in Continuous Optimization and particularly in Derivative-Free Optimization. He is the Timothy J. Wilmott '80 Endowed Chair Professor and Department Chair of the Department of Industrial and Systems Engineering of Lehigh University.

== Education ==
Luis Nunes Vicente was born in Coimbra, Portugal in 1967. He obtained a B.S. in Mathematics and Operations Research at the University of Coimbra in 1990. He continued his studies at Rice University, USA, earning a Ph.D. in Applied Mathematics in 1996. His Ph.D. dissertation, titled Trust-Region Interior-Point Algorithms for a Class of Nonlinear Programming Problems, was supervised by John Dennis.

== Career ==
From 1996 to 2018, Luis Nunes Vicente was a faculty member at the Department of Mathematics of the University of Coimbra, Portugal, becoming full professor in 2009. He held several visiting positions, namely at the IBM T.J. Watson Research Center and the University of Minnesota in 2002–2003, at the Courant Institute of Mathematical Sciences, New York University and the Université Paul Verlaine of Metz in 2009–2010, and at Roma/Sapienza and Rice University in 2016–2017. He was visiting Chercheur Sénior of the Fondation de Coopération Sciences et Technologies pour l'Aéronautique et l'Espace at CERFACS and IPN Toulouse, during 2010–2015.

He has served on numerous editorial boards, including SIAM Journal on Optimization (2009–2017), EURO Journal on Computational Optimization, and Optimization Methods and Software (2010–2018). He was Editor-in-Chief of Portugaliae Mathematica during 2013–2018.

He was elected chair of the SIAM Activity Group on Optimization for 2023–2025 and President of the Association of Chairs of Operations Research Departments (ACORD) at INFORMS for 2024–2025.

== Book ==
Luis Nunes Vicente co-authored the book Introduction to Derivative-Free Optimization, MPS-SIAM Series on Optimization, SIAM, Philadelphia, 2009, with Katya Scheinberg and Andrew R. Conn.

== Recognition ==
Luis Nunes Vicente was awarded the Lagrange Prize of SIAM (Society for Industrial and Applied Mathematics) and MOS (Mathematical Optimization Society) for the co-authorship of the book Introduction to Derivative-Free Optimization.

With his Ph.D. dissertation, he received the Ralph Budd Thesis Award from Rice University in 1996 and was one of the three finalists of the 94-96 A. W. Tucker Prize of MOS.

He gave several plenary and keynote talks at major conferences, including the International Symposium on Mathematical Programming 2018 and the International Conference on Continuous Optimization 2010.

In 2024, Luis Nunes Vicente was elected a Fellow of SIAM for his contributions to derivative-free and bilevel optimization, and leadership in editorial and organizational service to the SIAM community.
