= Alan M. Frieze =

British mathematician

Alan M. Frieze (born 25 October 1945 in London, England) is a professor in the Department of Mathematical Sciences at Carnegie Mellon University, Pittsburgh, United States. He graduated from the University of Oxford in 1966, and obtained his PhD from the University of London in 1975. His research interests lie in combinatorics, discrete optimisation and theoretical computer science. Currently, he focuses on the probabilistic aspects of these areas; in particular, the study of the asymptotic properties of random graphs, the average case analysis of algorithms, and randomised algorithms. His recent work has included approximate counting and volume computation via random walks; finding edge disjoint paths in expander graphs, and exploring anti-Ramsey theory and the stability of routing algorithms.

== Key contributions ==
Two key contributions made by Alan Frieze are:

(1) polynomial time algorithm for approximating the volume of convex bodies

(2) algorithmic version for Szemerédi regularity lemma

Both these algorithms will be described briefly here.

=== Polynomial time algorithm for approximating the volume of convex bodies ===
The paper is a joint work by Martin Dyer, Alan Frieze and Ravindran Kannan.

The main result of the paper is a randomised algorithm for finding an $\epsilon$ approximation to the volume of a convex body $K$ in $n$-dimensional Euclidean space by assume the existence of a membership oracle. The algorithm takes time bounded by a polynomial in $n$, the dimension of $K$ and $1/\epsilon$.

The algorithm is a sophisticated usage of the so-called Markov chain Monte Carlo (MCMC) method. The basic scheme of the algorithm is a nearly uniform sampling from within $K$ by placing a grid consisting n-dimensional cubes and doing a random walk over these cubes. By using the theory of rapidly mixing Markov chains, they show that it takes a polynomial time for the random walk to settle down to being a nearly uniform distribution.

=== Algorithmic version for Szemerédi regularity partition ===
This paper is a combined work by Alan Frieze and Ravindran Kannan. They use two lemmas to derive the algorithmic version of the Szemerédi regularity lemma to find an $\epsilon$-regular partition.

Lemma 1:
Fix k and $\gamma$ and let $G=(V,E)$ be a graph with $n$ vertices. Let $P$ be an equitable partition of $V$ in classes $V_0, V_1, \ldots ,V_k$. Assume $|V_1| > 4^{2k}$ and $4^k >600 \gamma ^2$. Given proofs that more than $\gamma k^2$ pairs $(V_r,V_s)$ are not $\gamma$-regular, it is possible to find in O(n) time an equitable partition $P'$ (which is a refinement of $P$) into $1+k4^k$ classes, with an exceptional class of cardinality at most $|V_0|+n/4^k$ and such that $\operatorname{ind}(P')\geq \operatorname{ind}(P) + \gamma^5/20$

Lemma 2:
Let $W$ be a $R \times C$ matrix with $|R|=p$, $|C|=q$ and $\|W\|_\inf\leq1$ and $\gamma$ be a positive real.
(a) If there exist $S \subseteq R$, $T \subseteq C$ such that $|S|\geq\gamma p$, $|T|\geq\gamma q$ and $|W(S,T)|\geq\gamma |S||T|$ then $\sigma_1(W)\geq\gamma^3\sqrt{pq}$
(b) If $\sigma_1(W)\geq\gamma\sqrt{pq}$, then there exist $S\subseteq R$, $T\subseteq C$ such that $|S|\geq\gamma'p$, $|T|\geq\gamma'q$ and $W(S,T)\geq\gamma'|S||T|$ where $\gamma'=\gamma^3/108$. Furthermore, $S$, $T$ can be constructed in polynomial time.

These two lemmas are combined in the following algorithmic construction of the Szemerédi regularity lemma.

[Step 1] Arbitrarily divide the vertices of $G$ into an equitable partition $P_1$ with classes $V_0,V_1,\ldots,V_b$ where $|V_i|\lfloor n/b \rfloor$ and hence $|V_0|<b$. denote $k_1=b$.
[Step 2] For every pair $(V_r,V_s)$ of $P_i$, compute $\sigma_1(W_{r,s})$. If the pair $(V_r,V_s)$ are not $\epsilon-$regular then by Lemma 2 we obtain a proof that they are not $\gamma=\epsilon^9/108-$regular.
[Step 3] If there are at most $\epsilon \left( \begin{array}{c} k_1\\ 2 \\ \end{array} \right)$ pairs that produce proofs of non $\gamma-$regularity that halt. $P_i$ is $\epsilon-$regular.
[Step 4] Apply Lemma 1 where $P=P_i$, $k=k_i$, $\gamma=\epsilon^9/108$ and obtain $P'$ with $1+k_i4^{k_i}$ classes
[Step 5] Let $k_i+1 = k_i4^{k_i}$, $P_i+1=P'$, $i=i+1$ and go to Step 2.

== Awards and honours ==
- In 1991, Frieze received (jointly with Martin Dyer and Ravi Kannan) the Fulkerson Prize in Discrete Mathematics awarded by the American Mathematical Society and the Mathematical Programming Society. The award was for the paper "A random polynomial time algorithm for approximating the volume of convex bodies" in the Journal of the ACM).
- In 1997 he was a Guggenheim Fellow.
- In 2000, he received the IBM Faculty Partnership Award.
- In 2006 he jointly received (with Michael Krivelevich) the Professor Pazy Memorial Research Award from the United States-Israel Binational Science Foundation.
- In 2011 he was selected as a SIAM Fellow.
- In 2012 he was selected as an AMS Fellow.
- In 2014 he gave a plenary talk at the International Congress of Mathematicians in Seoul, South Korea.
- In 2015 he was selected as a Simons Fellow.
- In 2017 he was promoted to University professor.
- In 2022 he became the Orion Hoch, S 1952 Professor.

== Personal life ==
Frieze is married to Carol Frieze, who directs two outreach efforts for the computer science department at Carnegie Mellon University.
