= Tucker Prize =

- Awarded for: Outstanding doctoral theses in the area of mathematical optimization
- Country: United States
- Presented by: Mathematical Optimization Society
- Reward: $1,000
- First award: 1988

The Tucker Prize for outstanding theses in the area of optimization is sponsored by the Mathematical Optimization Society (MOS). Up to three finalists are presented at each (triennial) International Symposium of the MOS. The winner will receive an award of $1000 and a certificate. The Albert W. Tucker Prize was approved by the Society in 1985, and was first awarded at the Thirteenth International Symposium on Mathematical Programming in 1988.

== Winners and finalists ==
- 1988:
  - Andrew V. Goldberg for "Efficient graph algorithms for sequential and parallel computers".
- 1991:
  - Michel Goemans for "Analysis of Linear Programming Relaxations for a Class of Connectivity Problems".
  - Other Finalists: Leslie Hall and Mark Hartmann
- 1994:
  - David P. Williamson for "On the Design of Approximation Algorithms for a Class of Graph Problems".
  - Other Finalists: Dick Den Hertog and Jiming Liu
- 1997:
  - David Karger for "Random Sampling in Graph Optimization Problems".
  - Other Finalists: Jim Geelen and Luis Nunes Vicente
- 2000:
  - Bertrand Guenin for his PhD thesis.
  - Other Finalists: Kamal Jain and Fabian Chudak
- 2003:
  - Tim Roughgarden for "Selfish Routing".
  - Other Finalists: Pablo Parrilo and Jiming Peng
- 2006:
  - Uday V. Shanbhag for "Decomposition and Sampling Methods for Stochastic Equilibrium Problems".
  - Other Finalists: José Rafael Correa and Dion Gijswijt
- 2009:
  - Mohit Singh for "Iterative Methods in Combinatorial Optimization".
  - Other Finalists: Tobias Achterberg and Jiawang Nie
- 2012:
  - Oliver Friedmann for "Exponential Lower Bounds for Solving Infinitary Payoff Games and Linear Programs".
  - Other Finalists: Amitabh Basu and Guanghui Lan
- 2015:
  - Daniel Dadush for "Integer Programming, Lattice Algorithms, and Deterministic Volume Computation".
  - Other Finalists: Dmitriy Drusvyatskiy and Marika Karbstein
- 2018:
  - Yin Tat Lee for "Faster Algorithms for Convex and Combinatorial Optimization".
  - Other Finalists: Damek Davis and Adrien Taylor
- 2021:
  - Jakub Tarnawski for "New Graph Algorithms via Polyhedral Techniques".
  - Other Finalists: Georgina Hall and Yair Carmon

== See also ==
- List of computer science awards
