= Julia Böttcher =

German discrete mathematician

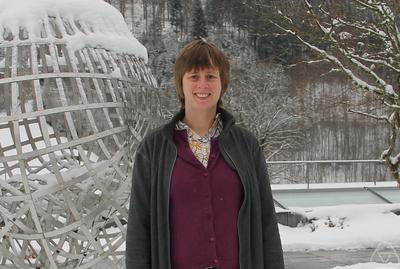
Böttcher at Oberwolfach in 2026

Julia Böttcher is a German discrete mathematician and a professor of mathematics at the London School of Economics. Her research involves graph theory, including graph and hypergraph packing problems, random graphs and random subgraphs, and the relations between graph parameters including graph bandwidth, degree, and chromatic number.

== Education and career ==
After secondary school in Erfurt, Böttcher studied computer science at the Humboldt University of Berlin, with an exchange year at the University of Toronto. She earned a diploma in 2005. She completed a Ph.D. in mathematics at the Technical University of Munich in 2009, with the dissertation Embedding Large Graphs – The Bollobás-Komlós Conjecture and Beyond supervised by Anusch Taraz.

After postdoctoral research at Technical University of Munich and at the University of São Paulo in Brazil, Böttcher became a lecturer at the London School of Economics in 2012. She was named as an associate professor in 2016 and promoted to professor in 2020.

== Recognition ==
Böttcher was a recipient of the 2018 Fulkerson Prize for her research with Robert Morris, Yoshiharu Kohayakawa, Simon Griffiths, an Peter Allen on "the chromatic thresholds of graphs" relating the degree and the chromatic number of graphs with a forbidden induced subgraph.

She was an invited speaker at the 2022 (virtual) International Congress of Mathematicians, speaking on hypergraph packing.
