= Agrawal's conjecture =

In number theory, Agrawal's conjecture, due to Manindra Agrawal in 2002, forms the basis for the cyclotomic AKS test. Agrawal's conjecture states formally:

Let $n$ and $r$ be two coprime positive integers. If

$$(X - 1)^n \equiv X^n - 1 \pmod{n,\, X^r - 1} \,$$

then either $n$ is prime or $n^2 \equiv 1 \pmod r$

== Ramifications ==
If Agrawal's conjecture were true, it would decrease the runtime complexity of the AKS primality test from $\tilde O\mathord\left(\log^{6} n\right)$ to $\tilde O\mathord\left(\log^3 n\right)$.

== Truth or falsehood ==
The conjecture was formulated by Rajat Bhattacharjee and Prashant Pandey in their 2001 thesis. It has been computationally verified for $r < 100$ and $n < 10^{10}$, and for $r = 5, n < 10^{11}$.

However, a heuristic argument by Carl Pomerance and Hendrik W. Lenstra suggests there are infinitely many counterexamples. In particular, the heuristic shows that such counterexamples have asymptotic density greater than $\tfrac{1}{n^{\varepsilon}}$ for any $\varepsilon > 0$.

Assuming Agrawal's conjecture is false by the above argument, Roman B. Popovych conjectures a modified version may still be true:

Let $n$ and $r$ be two coprime positive integers. If

$$(X - 1)^n \equiv X^n - 1 \pmod{n,\, X^r - 1}$$

and

$$(X + 2)^n \equiv X^n + 2 \pmod{n,\, X^r - 1}$$

then either $n$ is prime or $n^2 \equiv 1 \pmod{r}$.

== Distributed computing ==
Both Agrawal's conjecture and Popovych's conjecture were tested by distributed computing project Primaboinca which ran from 2010 to 2020, based on BOINC. The project found no counterexample, searching in $10^{10} < n < 10^{17}$.
