= Katya Scheinberg =

Russian-American applied mathematician

- Education: Moscow State University; Columbia University (PhD, 1997)
- Scientific career
- Fields: applied mathematics
- Workplaces: Georgia Institute of Technology; Cornell University; Lehigh University
- Doctoral advisor: Donald Goldfarb

Katya Scheinberg is a Russian-American applied mathematician known for her research in continuous optimization and particularly in derivative-free optimization. She is a professor in the School of Industrial and Systems Engineering at Georgia Institute of Technology.

== Education and career ==
Scheinberg was born in Moscow. She completed a bachelor's and master's degree in computational mathematics and cybernetics at Moscow State University in 1992, and earned a Ph.D. in operations research at Columbia University in 1997. Her dissertation, Issues Related to Interior Point Methods for Linear and Semidefinite Programming, was supervised by Donald Goldfarb.

Scheinberg worked for IBM Research at the Thomas J. Watson Research Center from 1997 until 2009. After working as a research scientist at Columbia University and as an adjunct faculty member at New York University, she joined the Lehigh faculty in 2010. Scheinberg became Wagner Professor at Lehigh in 2014. In 2019 she moved to Cornell University where she was a professor in the School of Operations Research and Information Engineering. In July 2024 she moved to Georgia Tech.

Scheinberg has been editor-in-chief of the SIAM-MOS Book Series on Optimization since 2014, and was the editor of Optima, the newsletter of the Mathematical Programming Society, from 2011 to 2013.

== Research ==
Scheinberg works on the intersection of optimization and machine learning, in particular on kernel support vector machines.

With Andrew R. Conn and Luís Nunes Vicente, Scheinberg authored the book Introduction to Derivative Free Optimization (SIAM Press, 2008).

== Recognition ==
In 2015, with Conn and Vicente, she won the Lagrange Prize in Continuous Optimization of the Mathematical Optimization Society and Society for Industrial and Applied Mathematics for their book. The Prize citation wrote that "A small sampling of the direct impact of their work is seen in aerospace engineering, urban transport systems, adaptive meshing for partial differential equations, and groundwater remediation." In 2019, Professor Scheinberg was awarded the Farkas Prize by the Optimization Society in the Institute for Operations Research and the Management Sciences (INFORMS). In 2022 she was named a Fellow of INFORMS, "for outstanding research contributions to continuous optimization, particularly derivative-free optimization and the interface of optimization and machine learning, as well as outstanding service and leadership".

== Personal life ==
Scheinberg is married to Oktay Günlük, also a professor in the School of Industrial and Systems Engineering at Georgia Tech.
