= Defeng Sun =

Applied Mathematician

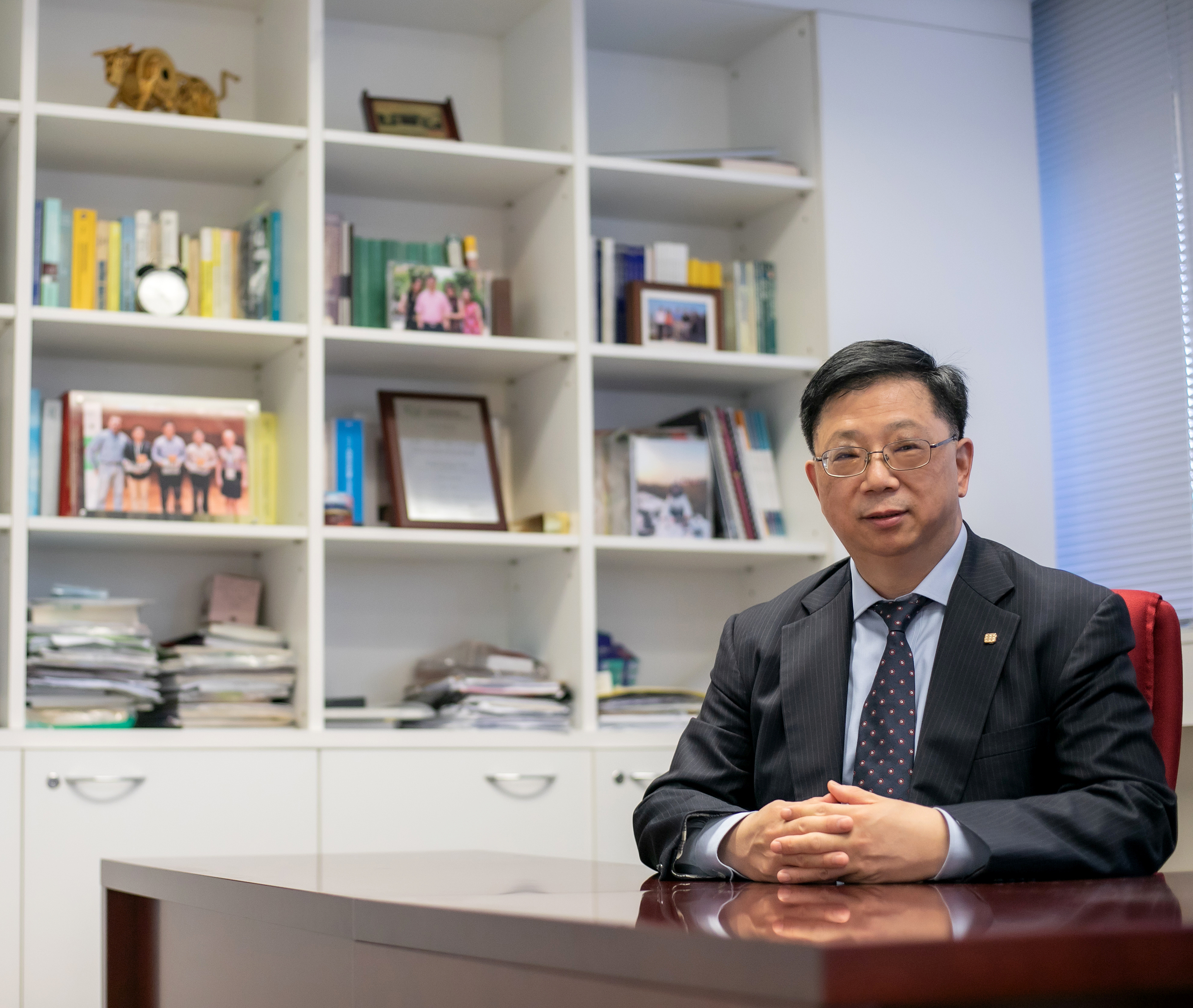
- Education: Nanjing University; Chinese Academy of Sciences
- Awards: Beale--Orchard-Hays Prize for Excellence in Computational Mathematical Programming 2018 by the Mathematical Optimization Society Fellow, the Society for Industrial and Applied Mathematics 2020 Fellow, China Society of Industrial and Applied Mathematics 2020 RGC Senior Research Fellow Award 2022/23 Fellow, Operations Research Society of China 2024
- Scientific career
- Fields: Optimization and Machine Learning
- Workplaces: Department of Applied Mathematics, The Hong Kong Polytechnic University
- Doctoral advisor: Jiye Han (Chinese name: 韩继业)...

Defeng Sun (Chinese name: 孙德锋) is a Chinese applied mathematician and operations researcher. He holds the position of Chair Professor of Applied Optimization and Operations Research, and has been serving as the Head of Department of Applied Mathematics in The Hong Kong Polytechnic University (PolyU) since 2019. Sun had been the President of The Hong Kong Mathematical Society in 2020-2024.

== Education ==
Sun received his Ph.D. degree in 1995 from Chinese Academy of Sciences in Beijing, after obtaining his bachelor's and Master’s degree from Nanjing University in 1989 and 1992, respectively.

== Research ==
Sun's research interests lie in the broad areas of non-convex continuous optimization and machine learning including mathematical theory, algorithmic developments and real-world applications.

In 2006, he solved the long-standing open question of characterizing the strong regularity of nonlinear semidefinite programming (SDP) problems.

Sun was awarded the triennial 2018 Beale-Orchard-Hays Prize for Excellence in Computational Mathematical Programming by Mathematical Optimization Society jointly with his collaborators for the work on software SDPNAL/SDPNAL+ for general purpose large scale semidefinite programming problems

== Awards ==
He was named a SIAM Fellow in 2020, for "contributions to algorithms and software for conic optimization, particularly matrix optimization", and Fellow of China Society for Industrial and Applied Mathematics in 2020 "for contributions to the field of industrial and applied mathematics"

He received the RGC Senior Research Fellowship for his project "Nonlinear Conic Programming: Theory, Algorithms and Software" by Hong Kong's University Grants Committee in 2022/23.

He was elected to the 2026 class of Fellows of the American Mathematical Society.
