= Tardo =

Tardo may refer to:

- tardo ("slow"), a now obsolete tempo marking in music
- Tardo Hammer (born 1958), American jazz pianist
- Manuel Rodulfo Tardo (1913–1998), Cuban artist
- Tardo, an administrative division of Buloburde District, Hiran, Somalia

== See also ==
- Tardos (disambiguation)
