= Roughgarden =

Roughgarden is a surname. Notable people with the surname include:

- Joan Roughgarden (born 1946), American ecologist and evolutionary biologist
- Tim Roughgarden (born 1975), American computer scientist
