= Tardos =

Tardos may refer to:

- Tardos, Tata, a village in Hungary
- Anne Tardos (born 1943), French artist
- Éva Tardos (born 1957), Hungarian mathematician
  - Tardos function, in graph theory
- Gábor Tardos (born 1964), Hungarian mathematician

== See also ==
- Tadros
