= Leslie Ann Goldberg =

American computer scientist

Leslie Ann Goldberg MAE FRS
- Born: Leslie Ann Goldberg
- Education: Rice University (BS); University of Edinburgh (PhD)
- Awards: Suffrage Science award (2016); Marshall Scholarship (1991)
- Scientific career
- Workplaces: University of Oxford; Sandia National Laboratories; University of Warwick; University of Liverpool
- Thesis: Efficient Algorithms for Listing Combinatorial Structures (1991)
- Doctoral advisor: Mark Jerrum
- Website: www.cs.ox.ac.uk/people/leslieann.goldberg/

Leslie Ann Goldberg is a professor of computer science at the University of Oxford and a Fellow of St Edmund Hall, Oxford. Her research concerns the design and analysis of algorithms for random sampling and approximate combinatorial enumeration.

== Education ==
Goldberg did her undergraduate studies at Rice University and completed her PhD at the University of Edinburgh in 1992 under the joint supervision of Mark Jerrum and Alistair Sinclair after she was awarded the Marshall Scholarship. Her dissertation, on algorithms for listing structures with polynomial delay, won the Distinguished Dissertations in Computer Science prize.

== Career and research ==
Goldberg became the Head of Department for the Department of Computer Science, University of Oxford in October 2021.

Prior to working at Oxford, her employers have included Sandia National Laboratories, the University of Warwick, and the University of Liverpool.

Goldberg serves as editor-in-chief of the Journal of Discrete Algorithms, and has served as program chair of the algorithms track of the International Colloquium on Automata, Languages and Programming (ICALP) in 2008.

=== Awards and honours ===
She is a member of the Academia Europaea (MAE) and was awarded the Suffrage Science award in 2016.

In 2026 she was elected as a fellow of the Royal Society.
