= Neeraj Kayal =

Indian computer scientist and mathematician

- Education: IIT Kanpur
- Scientific career
- Workplaces: Institute for Advanced Study
- Doctoral advisor: Manindra Agrawal

Neeraj Kayal (Hindi: नीरज कयाल) is an Indian computer scientist and mathematician noted for development of the AKS primality test, along with Manindra Agrawal and Nitin Saxena. Kayal was born and raised in Guwahati, India.

== Early life and education ==
Kayal was born and raised in Guwahati, India.

Kayal graduated with a B.Tech from the Computer Science Department of the Indian Institute of Technology, Kanpur (IITK), India in 2002. In that year, Neeraj along with Manindra Agrawal and Nitin Saxena proposed the AKS primality test, which attracted worldwide attention, including an article in The New York Times.

Kayal received his PhD in theoretical computer science from the Department of Computer Science and Engineering at the Indian Institute of Technology, Kanpur. He did postdoctoral research at the Institute for Advanced Study in Princeton and at Rutgers University. Since 2008, he has been working with the Microsoft Research Lab India as a researcher.

== Awards ==
Neeraj Kayal was given the Distinguished Alumnus Award of the IITK, for his work in computational complexity theory. He is also a recipient of the Gödel Prize and the Fulkerson Prize for the same along with his co-authors. In 2012, he was awarded the Young Scientist Award from the Indian National Science Academy (INSA) for contributions to the development of arithmetic complexity theory including the development of a deterministic algorithm for primality testing, the resolution of the constant fan-in conjecture for depth three circuits, and a reconstruction algorithm for arithmetic formulas.

In 2021, he won the Infosys Prize in Mathematical Sciences. He was awarded the Shanti Swarup Bhatnagar Prize in Mathematical Sciences for the year 2022. The announcement of the awardees for 2022 was however made in 2023.
