= Nitin Saxena =

Indian mathematician and computer scientist

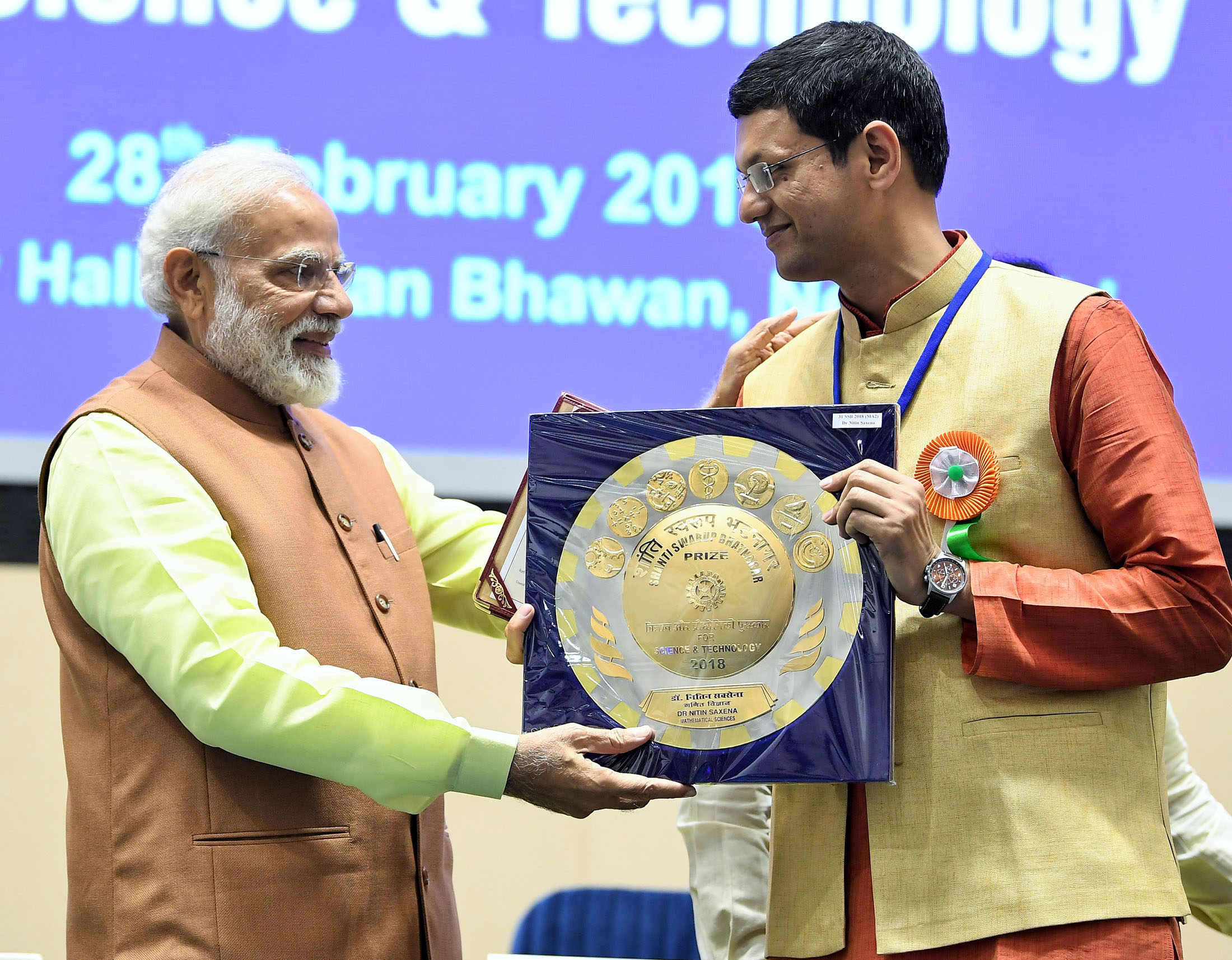
- Nitin Saxena receiving Shanti Swarup Bhatnagar Prize from Narendra Modi
- Born: 3 May 1981 (age 45); Prayagraj, India
- Education: IIT Kanpur
- Awards: Gödel Prize (2006); Fulkerson Prize (2006); Shanti Swarup Bhatnagar Prize (2018)
- Scientific career
- Fields: Mathematics; Theoretical computer science
- Workplaces: CWI Amsterdam; University of Bonn; IIT Kanpur
- Thesis: Morphisms of Rings and Applications to Complexity (2006)
- Doctoral advisor: Manindra Agrawal

Nitin Saxena (born 3 May 1981) is an Indian scientist in mathematics and theoretical computer science. His research focuses on computational complexity.

He attracted international attention for proposing the AKS Primality Test in 2002 in a joint work with Manindra Agrawal and Neeraj Kayal, for which the trio won the 2006 Fulkerson Prize, and the 2006 Gödel Prize. They provided the first unconditional deterministic algorithm to test an n-digit number for primality in a time that has been proven to be polynomial in n. This research work came out as a part of his undergraduate study.

== Early life and education ==
He is an alumnus of Boys' High School And College, Allahabad. He graduated with his B.Tech in Computer Science and Engineering from Indian Institute of Technology Kanpur in 2002. He received his PhD from the Department of Computer Science and Engineering of the same institute in 2006 with the Dissertation titled "Morphisms of Rings and Applications to Complexity".

== Career ==
He was awarded the Distinguished Alumnus Award of the Indian Institute of Technology Kanpur in 2003 for his work in computational complexity theory. He was a postdoctoral researcher at the Centrum Wiskunde & Informatica (CWI) in the Netherlands from 2006 to 2008, and a Bonn Junior Fellow at the University of Bonn from Summer 2008 onwards. He joined the Department of Computer Science and Engineering at IIT Kanpur as faculty in April 2013.

Saxena was awarded the 2018 Shanti Swarup Bhatnagar Prize for his work in Algebraic Complexity Theory. One of the youngest awardees, Saxena’s research interests include Computational Complexity and Algebraic Geometry.
