= Tim Roughgarden =

American computer scientist

Timothy Roughgarden
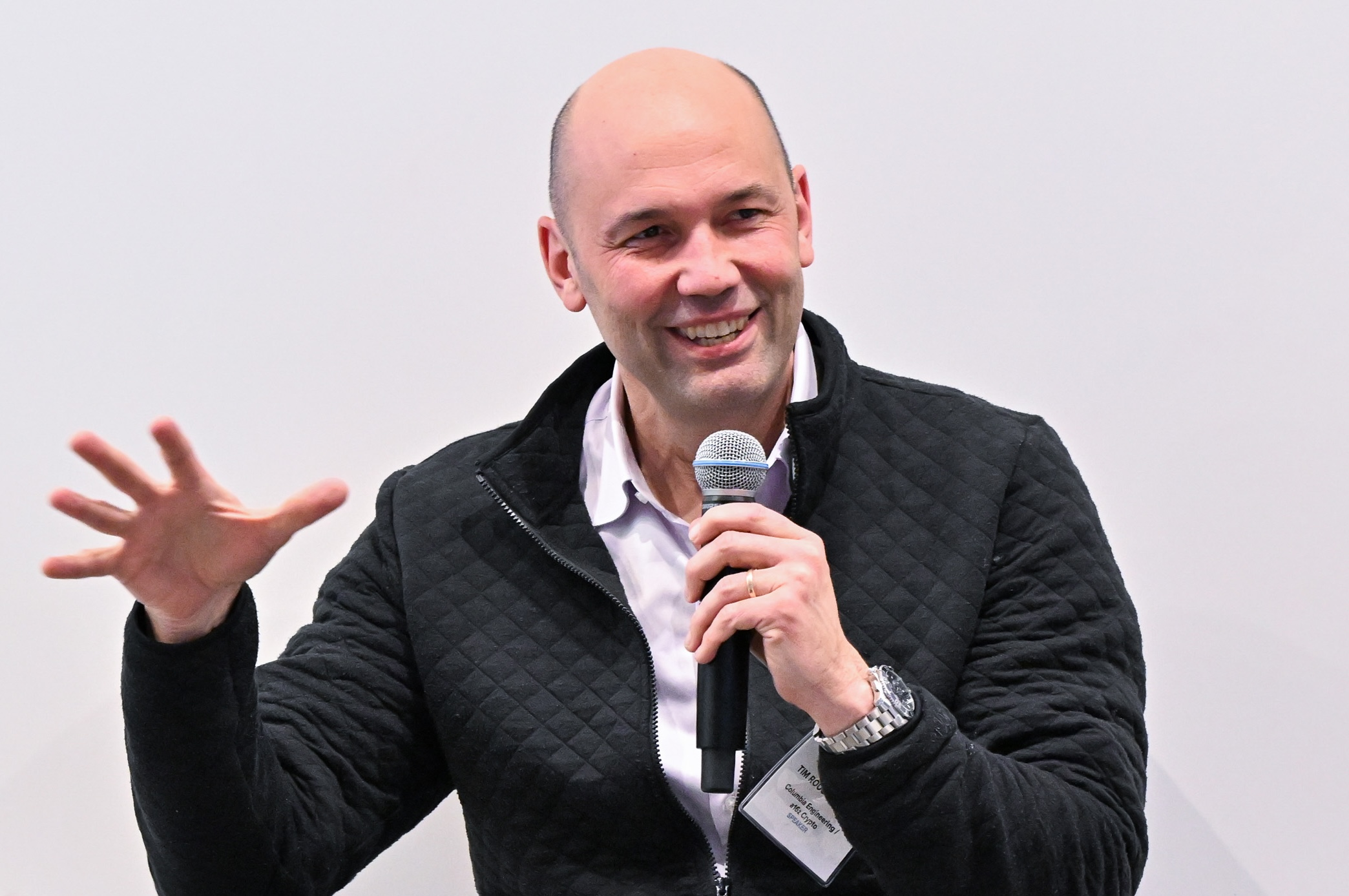
- Born: Timothy Avelin Roughgarden; July 20, 1975 (age 51)
- Education: Stanford University; Cornell University
- Known for: Contributions to algorithms and game theory in the context of computer science
- Awards: Member of the American Academy of Arts and Sciences (2026); ACM Fellow (2023); Frederick W. Lanchester Prize (2019); Guggenheim Fellowship (2017); Kalai Prize (2016); Gödel Prize (2012); Grace Murray Hopper Award (2009); Presidential Early Career Award for Scientists and Engineers (2007); Sloan Research Fellowship (2006); Tucker Prize (2003); ACM Doctoral Dissertation Award (2002); Danny Lewin Best Student Paper Award (2002)
- Scientific career
- Fields: Computer science, Game theory
- Workplaces: Institute for Advanced Study; Columbia University; Stanford University
- Thesis: Selfish routing (2002)
- Doctoral advisor: Éva Tardos
- Website: timroughgarden.org

Timothy Avelin Roughgarden (born July 20, 1975) is an American computer scientist whose research spans theoretical computer science, algorithmic game theory, mechanism design, and the economics of blockchain systems. He is a professor in the School of Mathematics at the Institute for Advanced Study and a professor of computer science at Columbia University. He is also the founding head of research at a16z crypto. He previously was a professor at Stanford University.

== Education ==
Roughgarden received a Bachelor of Science degree in applied mathematics from Stanford University in 1997 and a Master of Science degree in computer science from Stanford in 1998. He received a Master of Science degree in mathematics and a PhD in computer science from Cornell University in 2002. His doctoral dissertation was titled Selfish Routing.

== Academic career ==
After completing his doctorate, Roughgarden was a postdoctoral researcher at Cornell University from 2002 to 2003 and at the University of California, Berkeley from 2003 to 2004. He joined Stanford University in 2004 as an assistant professor of computer science, with a courtesy appointment in management science and engineering. He became an associate professor in 2011 and a professor in 2017.

From 2017 to 2018, Roughgarden was a visiting professor in the Department of Mathematics at the London School of Economics. He joined Columbia University as a professor of computer science in 2019. In 2022, he became founding head of research at a16z crypto.

In July, 2026, Roughgarden joined the Institute for Advanced Study as a professor in its School of Mathematics.

== Research ==
Roughgarden's research is in theoretical computer science, algorithmic game theory, and the application of algorithmic methods to economic systems. His work has examined strategic behavior in networks, markets, and distributed systems, with particular emphasis on the efficiency of equilibria and the design of mechanisms and algorithms.

In his early work on selfish routing and congestion games, Roughgarden studied how individual route choices affect overall network performance. With Éva Tardos, he co-authored "How Bad Is Selfish Routing?", which analyzed the inefficiency that can arise when network users act independently. This work used the concept of the price of anarchy to compare outcomes at equilibrium with socially optimal outcomes. He later developed a smoothness-based approach to deriving price-of-anarchy bounds, including in "Intrinsic Robustness of the Price of Anarchy".

Roughgarden has also worked in algorithmic mechanism design, including auction theory, cost-sharing mechanisms, and the design of markets with incomplete information. His publications have addressed optimal and approximately optimal auctions, prior-independent mechanisms, combinatorial auctions, and fair division. With Jason D. Hartline, he studied optimal mechanism design and auction design; later work with other collaborators examined revenue maximization from samples, contracts, and the computational aspects of mechanism design.

Another area of his research concerns alternatives to traditional worst-case analysis in algorithms. His work in this area has included data-driven algorithm design, learning-based approaches to choosing algorithms and mechanisms, and distribution-free models of networks and social graphs. He edited the volume Beyond the Worst-Case Analysis of Algorithms, which surveys analytical frameworks that incorporate input distributions, resource augmentation, and other approaches beyond standard worst-case guarantees.

Roughgarden's more recent research has addressed the economics and design of blockchain systems. He has studied transaction-fee mechanisms, permissionless consensus, mining pools, and automated market makers used in decentralized finance. His work on transaction-fee mechanism design considered incentive and implementation issues in blockchain protocols, while later work with collaborators examined automated market making, arbitrage, and loss-versus-rebalancing.

== Teaching ==
Roughgarden has developed teaching materials on algorithms, algorithmic game theory, mechanism design, and related areas of theoretical computer science. Since 2011, he has taught open online courses on algorithms through Coursera, which were later organized as a four-course Algorithms specialization. He has also made lecture notes and course videos available online, covering topics including algorithms, game theory, mechanism design, and blockchain economics.

== Awards and honors ==
- Danny Lewin Best Student Paper Award, STOC (2002), for "The Price of Anarchy Is Independent of the Network Topology"
- Honorable mention, ACM Doctoral Dissertation Award (2002), for his dissertation Selfish Routing
- Tucker Prize, Mathematical Programming Society (2003)
- INFORMS Optimization Prize for Young Researchers (2003), for "The Price of Anarchy Is Independent of the Network Topology".
- Invited speaker, International Congress of Mathematicians (2006)
- Sloan Research Fellowship (2006)
- Presidential Early Career Award for Scientists and Engineers (2007)
- ONR Young Investigator Award (2007–2010)
- Grace Murray Hopper Award (2009)
- Gödel Prize (2012)
- Social Choice and Welfare Prize, Society for Social Choice and Welfare (2014)
- Kalai Prize in Game Theory and Computer Science (2016)
- Stanford Tau Beta Pi Teaching Honor Roll (2017)
- Guggenheim Fellowship (2017)
- Frederick W. Lanchester Prize, Institute for Operations Research and the Management Sciences (2019), for Twenty Lectures on Algorithmic Game Theory.
- Fellow of the Game Theory Society (2019)
- Test of Time Award, Symposium on Foundations of Computer Science (2020), shared with Éva Tardos for "How Bad Is Selfish Routing?"
- Fellow of the Society for the Advancement of Economic Theory (2021)
- ACM Fellow (2023)
- Member of the American Academy of Arts and Sciences (2026)

== Books ==
- Selfish Routing and the Price of Anarchy (MIT Press, 2005)
- Algorithmic Game Theory (co-editor, with Noam Nisan, Éva Tardos, and Vijay V. Vazirani; Cambridge University Press, 2007)
- Communication Complexity (for Algorithm Designers) (2016)
- Twenty Lectures on Algorithmic Game Theory (Cambridge University Press, 2016)
- Algorithms Illuminated series (2017–2022)
- Beyond the Worst-Case Analysis of Algorithms (editor; Cambridge University Press, 2021)
- Complexity Theory, Game Theory, and Economics: The Barbados Lectures (Now Publishers, 2020)
