= Michel Goemans =

Belgian-American mathematician

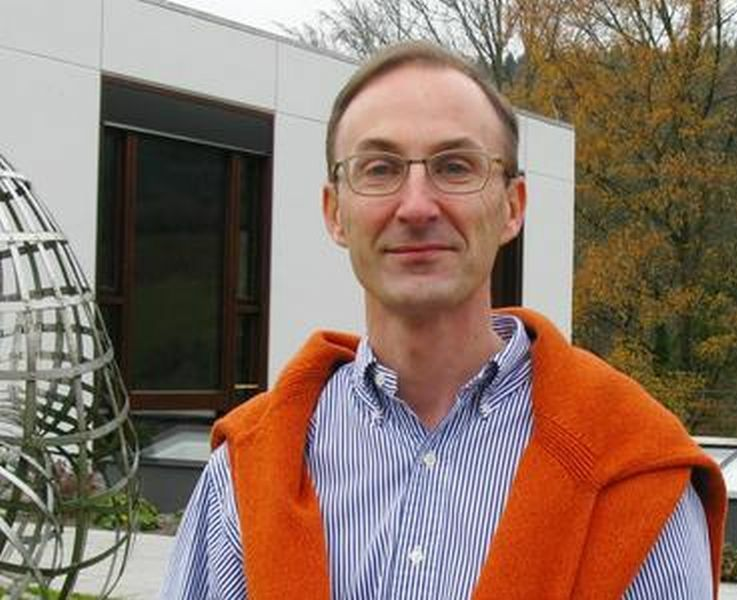
- Michel Goemans at Oberwolfach in 2011
- Born: Michel Xavier Goemans; December 1964 (age 61)
- Education: UCLouvain; Massachusetts Institute of Technology
- Scientific career
- Fields: Mathematics
- Workplaces: Massachusetts Institute of Technology
- Thesis: Analysis of Linear Programming Relaxations for a Class of Connectivity Problems (1990)
- Doctoral advisor: Dimitris Bertsimas
- Doctoral students: Jon Kleinberg; David P. Williamson; John Urschel
- Website: www-math.mit.edu/~goemans

Michel Xavier Goemans (born December 1964) is a Belgian-American professor of applied mathematics and the RSA Professor of Mathematics at Massachusetts Institute of Technology working in discrete mathematics and combinatorial optimization at CSAIL and MIT Operations Research Center.

== Career ==
Goemans earned his doctorate in 1990 from MIT. Goemans is the "Leighton Family Professor" of Applied Mathematics at MIT and an adjunct professor at the University of Waterloo. He was also a professor at the University of Louvain and a visiting professor at the RIMS of the University of Kyoto.

== Recognition ==
In 1991 he received the A.W. Tucker Prize. From 1995 to 1997 he was a Sloan Research Fellow. In 1998 he was an Invited Speaker of the International Congress of Mathematicians in Berlin. For the academic year 2007–2008 he Guggenheim Fellow.

Goemans is a Fellow of the Association for Computing Machinery (2008), a fellow of the American Mathematical Society (2012), and a fellow of the Society for Industrial and Applied Mathematics (2013). In 2000 he was awarded the MOS-AMS Fulkerson Prize for joint work with David P. Williamson on the semidefinite programming approximation algorithm for the maximum cut problem. In 2012 Goemans was awarded the Farkas Prize. In 2022 he received the AMS Steele Prize for Seminal Contribution to Research.

== Personal life ==
His hobby is sailing. Goemans has Belgian and US citizenship.
