= Mendu Rammohan Rao =

Indian academic

Prof. Mendu Rammohan Rao was the Dean Emeritus of Indian School of Business (ISB), Hyderabad. He was Provost at the Woxsen School of Business, Hyderabad.

== Biography ==
He has a PhD in Industrial Administration from Carnegie Mellon University. He holds a Bachelors in Engineering from College of Engineering, Guindy, a Master in Engineering and Master of Science in Industrial Engineering and Industrial Management.

He also taught at the Stern School of Business, New York University, Graduate School of Management, University of Rochester, Professor and as a visiting faculty at the University of Tennessee. He has held various positions at the Indian Institute of Management Bangalore (IIM-B) including the position of Director from March 1997 to May 2002. Before joining ISB as DEAN he was Professor Emeritus, Indian Institute of Management, Bangalore. Prof Rao has published over 85 articles in various professional journals.

In December 2008, the board of Satyam, including Prof Rammohan Rao, approved the acquisition for $1.6 billion of Maytas, a construction company owned by the same family that owns Satyam. Prof. Rao was the chairperson of the meeting that approved the controversial decision. A shareholder revolt prevented the deal. Prof. Rammohan Rao later resigned from the Satyam board.

Dr. Rao stepped down as dean of the Indian School of Business on 8 January 2009. He was later appointed as Dean Emeritus of the institute. On 1 July 2014, he was appointed as the Provost at Woxsen School of Business.

== Positions held ==
- Member of the Board of Directors Mazagon Docks Limited.
- Member of the Board of Directors Moschip Semiconductor Technology Limited.
- Chairman and member of the Board of Directors of Andhra Pradesh Industrial Development Corporation Venture Capital (APIDCVC).
- Chairman of the All India Board of Management Studies constituted by the All India Council for Technical Education.
- Advisory Board of General Motors India Science Laboratory.
- President of the Operational Research Society of India from January 2003 to January 2005.
- Member of the Advisory Board of Citigroup and member of the Board of Editors, OPSEARCH – a journal of the Operational Research Society of India.
- Member of the Graduate Management Admission Council (GMAC) Board, the first Indian business school Dean to occupy this position.
- Vice President of the All India Management Schools (AIMS) for the year 2007-2008.
- Member in the Executive Group of the Editorial Board at the Information Systems Frontiers – a Journal of Research and Innovation.

== Awards ==
- 2000: Fulkerson Prize, shared with Michele Conforti and Gérard Cornuéjols, for “Decomposition of balanced matrices”, Journal of Combinatorial Theory, Series B, 77 (1999), no. 2, pages 292–406.
- 2002: Award for Excellence as Top Management Educator, conferred by the Institute of Marketing and Management
- 2003: Ravi J. Mathai National Fellowship Award, conferred by the Association of Indian Management Schools
- 2004: Grid Leadership Award for Lifetime Achievement in Management Education
- 2005: Bharat Asmita Acharya Shrestha Award for his contribution to the field of Management Education instituted by the MIT School of Management, Pune.
