= Éva Tardos =

Hungarian mathematician

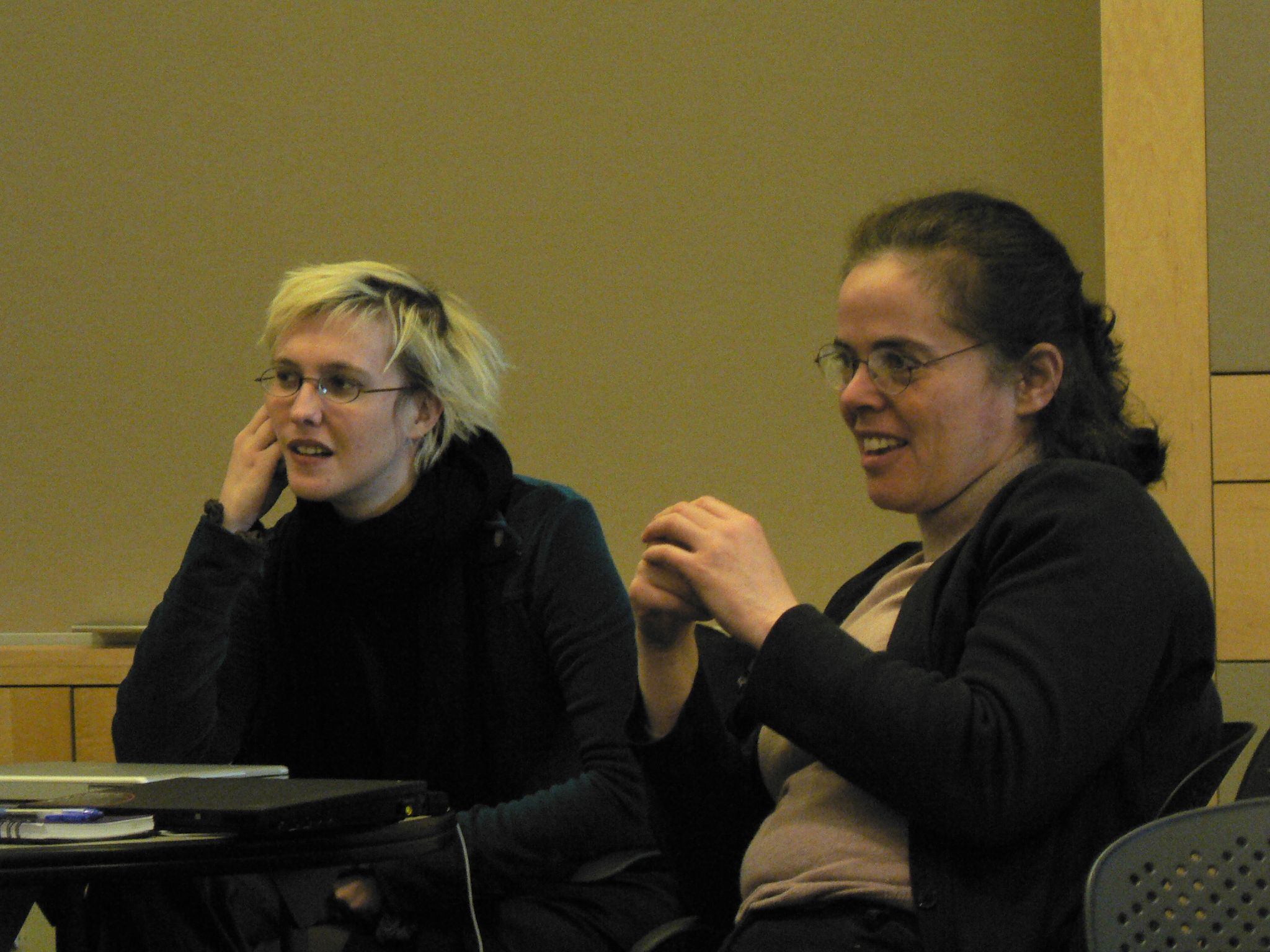
- Tardos (right) at Cornell University in 2007
- Born: 1 October 1957 (age 69); Budapest, Hungarian People's Republic
- Education: Eötvös Loránd University
- Known for: Tardos function theoretical computer science
- Awards: Fulkerson Prize (1988); Dantzig Prize (2006); Gödel Prize (2012); EATCS Award (2017); IEEE John von Neumann Medal (2019)
- Scientific career
- Fields: Mathematics
- Workplaces: Cornell University
- Doctoral advisor: András Frank
- Doctoral students: Tim Roughgarden
- Website: www.cs.cornell.edu/~eva/

Éva Tardos (Hungarian: [ˈtɒrdoʃ]; born 1 October 1957) is a Hungarian mathematician and the Jacob Gould Schurman Professor of Computer Science at Cornell University, known for her work in theoretical computer science. For her work, she has received the Fulkerson Prize (1988), the Dantzig Prize (2006), and the IEEE John von Neumann Medal (2019).

Tardos's research interest is algorithms and algorithmic game theory. Her work focuses on the design and analysis of efficient methods for combinatorial optimization problems on graphs or networks. She has done some work on network flow algorithms like approximation algorithms for network flows, cut, and clustering problems. Her recent work focuses on algorithmic game theory and simple auctions.

== Education and career ==
Tardos received her Dipl. Math in 1981 and her Ph.D. 1984 from the Faculty of Sciences of the Eötvös Loránd University under her advisor András Frank.

She was the Chair of the Department of Computer Science at Cornell from 2006 to 2010, and she is currently serving as the Associate Dean of the College of Computing and Information Science.

She was editor-in-chief of SIAM Journal on Computing from 2004 to 2009, and from 2015 until 2021, she was editor-in-chief of the Journal of the ACM (JACM). and is currently the Economics and Computation area editor of the Journal of the ACM as well as on the board of editors of Theory of Computing.

She has co-authored, with Jon Kleinberg, the 2005 textbook Algorithm Design (ISBN 9780321295354). Along with being a co-editor of 2007 textbook Algorithmic Game Theory, working alongside Noam Nisan, Tim Roughgarden, and Vijay V. Vazirani.

== Honors and awards ==
Tardos has been elected to the National Academy of Engineering (2007), the American Academy of Arts and Sciences, and the National Academy of Sciences (2013) and the American Philosophical Society (2020) She is also an ACM Fellow (since 1998), a Fellow of INFORMS, and a Fellow of the American Mathematical Society (2013) She is the recipient of Packard, Sloan Foundation, and Guggenheim fellowships.

She is the winner of the Fulkerson Prize (1988), the George B. Dantzig Prize (2006), the Van Wijngaarden Award (2011), the Gödel Prize (2012) and the EATCS Award (2017), In 2018, the Association for Women in Mathematics and Society for Industrial and Applied Mathematics selected her as their annual Sonia Kovalevsky Lecturer. In 2019 she was awarded the IEEE John von Neumann Medal.

Tardos was named the ACM Athena Lecturer for 2022-2023, for her "fundamental research contributions to combinatorial optimization, approximation algorithms, and algorithmic game theory, and for dedicated mentoring and service to these communities."

== Personal ==
Tardos is married to David Shmoys, a fellow professor at Cornell. Her younger brother, Gábor Tardos, is a mathematics professor in Vienna. Her father was Márton Tardos, a Hungarian economist and politician. Her mother was child psychologist Anna Tardos, and her grandmother was child psychologist Emmi Pikler.

== See also ==
- Tardos function
