= Yoshiharu Kohayakawa =

Japanese-Brazilian mathematician

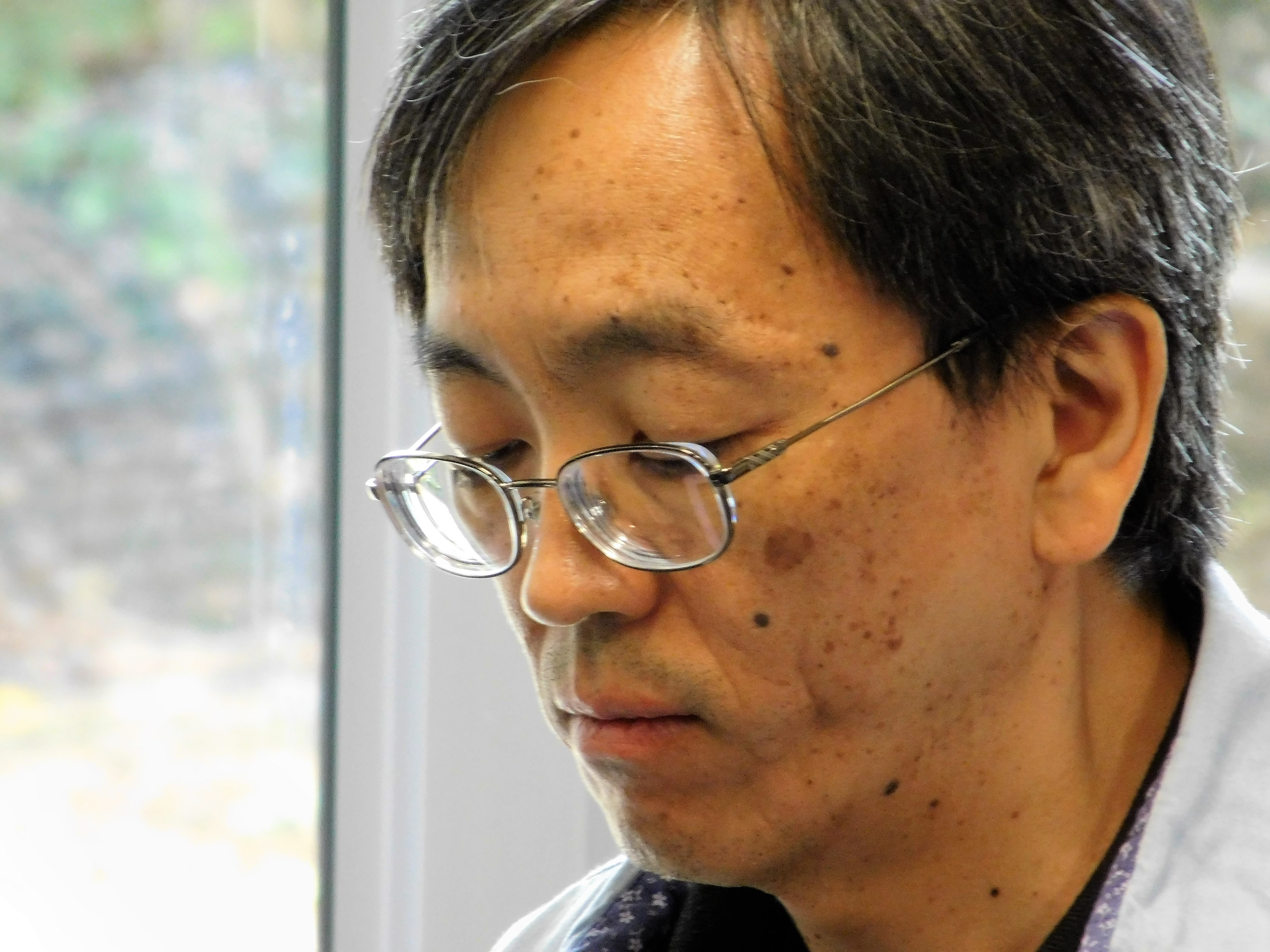
Yoshiharu Kohayakawa, in 2017.

Yoshiharu Kohayakawa (Japanese: 小早川美晴; born 1963) is a Japanese-Brazilian mathematician working on discrete mathematics and probability theory. He is known for his work on Szemerédi's regularity lemma, which he extended to sparser graphs.

== Biography ==
Kohayakawa has a PhD advised by Béla Bollobás at the University of Cambridge with the dissertation External Combinatorics and the Evolution of Random Graphs.

According to Google Scholar, as of August 21, 2019, Kohayakawa's works have been cited over 3194 times, and his h-index is 33.

He is a titular member of the Brazilian Academy of Sciences.

Kohayakawa has an Erdős number of 1.

He was awarded the 2018 Fulkerson Prize.
