= Ravindran Kannan =

Indian mathematician

Professor Ravindran Kannan ரவீந்திரன் கண்ணன்
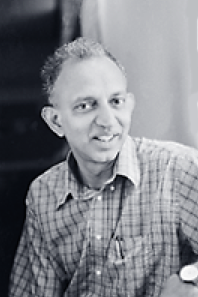
- Ravindran Kannan Prix Knuth 2011
- Born: 12 March 1953 (age 73); Madras, India
- Education: Indian Institute of Technology Bombay (B.Tech.); Cornell University (Ph.D.)
- Awards: Knuth Prize (2011); Fulkerson Prize (1991)
- Scientific career
- Fields: Computer science

Ravindran (Ravi) Kannan (Tamil: ரவீந்திரன் கண்ணன்); born 12 March 1953, is a theoretical computer scientist. His work has mainly focused on efficient algorithms for problems of a mathematical (often geometric) flavor that arise in Computer Science, Machine Learning and Optimization.

Ravi was a Principal Researcher at Microsoft Research Lab, India. Before joining Microsoft, he was William K. Lanman Jr. Professor of Computer Science and Professor of Applied Mathematics at Yale University. Prior to that he has been on the faculty of CMU and MIT. The ACM Special Interest Group on Algorithms and Computation Theory (SIGACT) presented its 2011 Knuth Prize to Ravi Kannan for developing influential algorithmic techniques aimed at solving long-standing computational problems.

Ravi Kannan did his B.Tech at IIT, Bombay. He received his PhD in 1980 at Cornell University under Leslie Earl Trotter, Jr.

== Awards and honors ==
- Joint Winner of the 1991 Fulkerson Prize in Discrete Mathematics for his work on the volumes of convex bodies.
- Knuth Prize 2011 for developing influential algorithmic techniques aimed at solving long-standing computational problems.
- In 2017 he became a Fellow of the Association for Computing Machinery.
- Member, American Academy of Arts and Sciences
- Member, National Academy of Sciences

== Key contributions ==
1. Algorithm for approximating the volume of high dimensional convex sets via Markov Chains

2. Algorithms for Integer Programming the Frobenius Problem drawing on Geometry of Numbers

3. Randomized algorithms for Principal Component Analysis and Matrix Compression

4. Algorithmic version of the regularity lemma in Graph Theory

== Selected works ==
=== Books ===
- 2020. Foundations of Data Science. (with Avrim Blum and John Hopcroft).
- 2009. Spectral Algorithms.(with Santosh Vempala)

=== Other representative publications ===
- "Clustering in large graphs and matrices," with P. Drineas, A. Frieze, S. Vempala and V. Vinay, Proceedings of the Symposium on Discrete Algorithms, 1999.
- "A Polynomial-Time Algorithm for learning noisy Linear Threshold functions," with A. Blum, A. Frieze and S. Vempala, Algorithmica 22:35–52, 1998.
- "Covering Minima and lattice point free convex bodies," with L. Lovász, Annals of Mathematics, 128:577–602, 1988.

== See also ==
- Szemerédi regularity lemma
- Alan M. Frieze
- Avrim Blum
- László Lovász
- Santhosh Vempala
