= Perfect matrix =

Type of binary matrix

In mathematics, a perfect matrix is an m-by-n binary matrix that has no possible k-by-k submatrix K that satisfies the following conditions:

- k > 3
- the row and column sums of K are each equal to b, where b ≥ 2
- there exists no row of the (m − k)-by-k submatrix formed by the rows not included in K with a row sum greater than b.

The following is an example of a K submatrix where k = 5 and b = 2:

$$\begin{bmatrix}
1 & 1 & 0 & 0 & 0 \\
0 & 1 & 1 & 0 & 0 \\
0 & 0 & 1 & 1 & 0 \\
0 & 0 & 0 & 1 & 1 \\
1 & 0 & 0 & 0 & 1
\end{bmatrix}.$$
