= David P. Williamson =

American mathematician

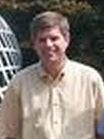
David Paul Williamson

David Paul Williamson is a professor of operations research at Cornell University, and the editor-in-chief of the SIAM Journal on Discrete Mathematics. He earned his Ph.D. in 1993 from the Massachusetts Institute of Technology under the supervision of Michel Goemans, and is best known for his work with Goemans on approximation algorithms based on semidefinite programming, for which they won the Fulkerson Prize in 2000. He also received the Frederick W. Lanchester Prize in 2013. In 2022 he received the AMS Steele Prize for Seminal Contribution to Research.
