= Alistair Sinclair =

British computer scientist (born 1960)

Alistair Sinclair (born 1960) is a British computer scientist and computational theorist.

Sinclair received his B.A. in mathematics from St. John’s College, Cambridge in 1979, and his Ph.D. in computer science from the University of Edinburgh in 1988 under the supervision of Mark Jerrum. He is professor at the Computer Science division at the University of California, Berkeley and has held faculty positions at University of Edinburgh and visiting positions at DIMACS and the International Computer Science Institute in Berkeley.

Sinclair’s research interests include the design and analysis of randomized algorithms, computational applications of stochastic processes and nonlinear dynamical systems, Monte Carlo methods in statistical physics and combinatorial optimization. With his advisor Mark Jerrum, Sinclair investigated the mixing behaviour of Markov chains to construct approximation algorithms for counting problems such as the computing the permanent, with applications in diverse fields such as matching algorithms, geometric algorithms, mathematical programming, statistics, physics-inspired applications and dynamical systems. This work has been highly influential in theoretical computer science and was recognised with the Gödel Prize in 1996. A refinement of these methods led to a fully polynomial time randomised approximation algorithm for computing the permanent, for which Sinclair and his co-authors received the Fulkerson Prize in 2006.

Sinclair's initial forms part of the name of the GNRS conjecture on metric embeddings of minor-closed graph families.
