= Mark Jerrum =

Theoretical computer scientist

Mark Richard Jerrum
- Born: 1955 (age 70–71)
- Education: University of Edinburgh
- Known for: Markov chain Monte Carlo methods, approximation algorithms
- Awards: Gödel Prize (1996), Fulkerson Prize (2006)
- Scientific career
- Fields: Computer Science, Computational Theory

Mark Richard Jerrum (born 1955) is a British computer scientist and computational theorist.

Jerrum received his Ph.D. in computer science 'On the complexity of evaluating multivariate polynomials' in 1981 from University of Edinburgh under the supervision of Leslie Valiant. He is professor of pure mathematics at Queen Mary, University of London.

With his student Alistair Sinclair, Jerrum investigated the mixing behaviour of Markov chains to construct approximation algorithms for counting problems such as the computing the permanent, with applications in diverse fields such as matching algorithms, geometric algorithms, mathematical programming, statistics, physics-inspired applications, and dynamical systems. This work has been highly influential in theoretical computer science and was recognised with the Gödel Prize in 1996. A refinement of these methods led to a fully polynomial-time randomised approximation algorithm for computing the permanent, for which Jerrum and his co-authors received the Fulkerson Prize in 2006.

== Select publications ==
- Frieze, A., Jerrum, M., Molloy M., Robinson, R., & Wormald, N. (1996). Generating and counting Hamilton cycles in random regular graphs. Journal of Algorithms, 21, 176–198.
