= Manindra Agrawal =

Indian computer scientist (born 1966)

Manindra Agrawal FRS
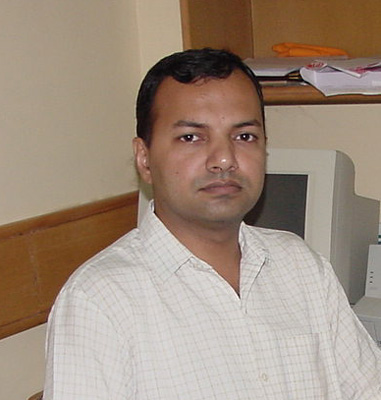
- Born: 20 May 1966 (age 60)
- Education: Indian Institute of Technology Kanpur
- Known for: AKS primality test
- Awards: Clay Research Award (2002); S S Bhatnagar Prize (2003); ICTP Prize (2003); Fulkerson Prize (2006); Gödel Prize (2006); Infosys Prize (2008); G.D. Birla Award for Scientific Research (2009); Padma Shri (2013)
- Scientific career
- Fields: Computer Science
- Workplaces: Indian Institute of Technology Kanpur
- Doctoral advisor: Somenath Biswas
- Doctoral students: Neeraj Kayal; Nitin Saxena

Manindra Agrawal (born 20 May 1966) is an Indian computer scientist and director of Indian Institute of Technology, Kanpur. He is also a professor at the Department of Computer Science and Engineering at the Indian Institute of Technology, Kanpur. He was the recipient of the first Infosys Prize for Mathematics, the Godel Prize in 2006; and the Shanti Swarup Bhatnagar Award in Mathematical Sciences in 2003. He has been honoured with Padma Shri, India's fourth highest civilian award, in 2013.

== Career ==
He created the AKS primality test with Neeraj Kayal and Nitin Saxena, for which he and his co-authors won the 2006 Fulkerson Prize, and the 2006 Gödel Prize. He was also awarded 2002 Clay Research Award for this work. The test is the first unconditional deterministic algorithm to test an n-digit number for primality in a time that has been proven to be polynomial in n.

In September 2008, Agrawal was chosen for the first Infosys Mathematics Prize for outstanding contributions in the broad field of mathematics. He also served on the Mathematical Sciences jury for the Infosys Prize in 2014 and 2015. He was a visiting scholar at the Institute for Advanced Study in 2003-04.

Agarwal served as the Deputy Director of IIT Kanpur from 2017 to 2021.

On, 19 April 2024 he was appointed as the Director of IIT Kanpur.

== Awards and honors ==
- Clay Research Award (2002)
- S S Bhatnagar Prize in Mathematical Sciences (2003)
- ICTP Prize (2003)
- Fulkerson Prize (2006)
- Gödel Prize (2006)
- Infosys Prize (2008)
- G.D. Birla Award for Scientific Research (2009)
- TWAS Prize in Mathematics (2010)
- Padma Shri (2013)
- Asian Scientist 100, Asian Scientist (2016)
- Goyal Prize (2017)
- Fellow of the Royal Society FRS (2026)
