= Continuous optimization =

Branch of optimization in applied mathematics

Continuous optimization is a branch of optimization in applied mathematics.

As opposed to discrete optimization, the variables used in the objective function are required to be continuous variables—that is, to be chosen from a set of real values between which there are no gaps (values from intervals of the real line). Because of this continuity assumption, continuous optimization allows the use of calculus techniques.
