= Mathematical Optimization Society =

International association of researchers active in optimization

The Mathematical Optimization Society (MOS), known as the Mathematical Programming Society (MPS) until 2010, is an international association of researchers active in optimization. The MOS encourages the research, development, and use of optimization—including mathematical theory, software implementation, and practical applications (operations research).

Founded in 1973 (53 years ago) with George Dantzig as the inaugural chair, the MOS has several activities: Publishing journals and a newsletter, organizing and cosponsoring conferences, and awarding prizes.

== History ==
In the 1960s, mathematical programming methods were gaining increasing importance both in mathematical theory and in industrial application. To provide a discussion forum for researchers in the field arose, the journal Mathematical Programming was founded in 1970.

Based on activities by George Dantzig, Albert Tucker, Philip Wolfe and others, the MOS was founded in 1973, with George Dantzig as its first president.

=== Chairs ===
- George B. Dantzig (1973–1974)
- E. M. L. Beale (1974–1976)
- Albert W. Tucker (1976–1978)
- Philip Wolfe (1978–1980)
- Jean M. Abadie (1980–1983)
- Alex Orden (1983–1986)
- Michel L. Balinski (1986–1989)
- George L. Nemhauser (1989–1992)
- Jan Karel Lenstra (1992–1995)
- John E. Dennis, Jr. (1995–1998)
- Jean-Philippe Vial (1998–2001)
- Robert E. Bixby (2001–2004)
- Rolf H. Möhring (2004–2007)
- Stephen J. Wright (2007–2010)
- Philippe Toint (2010–2013)
- William J. Cook (2013–2016)
- Karen Aardal (2016–2019)
- John R. Birge (2019–2022)
- Miguel Anjos (2023–2025)
- Katya Scheinberg (2025–now)

== Activities ==
=== Conferences ===
Several conferences are organized or co-organized by the Mathematical Optimization Society, for instance:

- The International Symposium on Mathematical Programming (ISMP), organized every three years, is open to all fields of mathematical programming.
- The Integer Programming and Combinatorial Optimization (IPCO) conference, in integer programming, is held in those years when there is no ISMP.
- The International Conference on Continuous Optimization (ICCOPT), the continuous analog of the IPCO conference, was first held in 2004.
- The International Conference on Stochastic Programming (ICSP) takes place every three years and is devoted to optimization using uncertain input data.
- The Nordic MOS conference is a biannual meeting of researchers from Scandinavia working in all fields of optimization.
- At the Université de Montréal, annual seminars on changing topics are organized by the MOS.

=== Journals and other publications ===
There are several publications by the Mathematical Optimization Society:

- The journal Mathematical Programming (series A/B): series A publishes articles from all fields of optimization; each issue of series B is devoted to a particular subject.
- The journal Mathematical Programming Computation
- Optima, the newsletter of the MOS, contains articles on optimization, conference information and book reviews.
- MPS/SIAM Series on Optimization is a series of books that is jointly published by the MOS (formerly MPS) and the Society for Industrial and Applied Mathematics (SIAM). It has published monographs, textbooks, books collecting applications of optimization, and tutorials.

=== Prizes ===
The MOS awards prizes in the field of optimization, including the Fulkerson Prize, the Dantzig Prize and the Tucker Prize.
