= Iterated logarithm =

Inverse function to a tower of powers

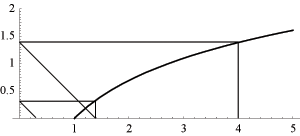
Figure 1. Demonstrating log* 4 = 2 for the base-e iterated logarithm. The value of the iterated logarithm can be found by "zig-zagging" on the curve y = log_{b}(x) from the input n, to the interval [0,1]. In this case, b = e. The zig-zagging entails starting from the point (n, 0) and iteratively moving to (n, log_{b}(n) ), to (0, log_{b}(n) ), to (log_{b}(n), 0 ).

In computer science, the iterated logarithm of $n$, written log* $n$ (usually read "log star"), is the number of times the logarithm function must be iteratively applied before the result is less than or equal to $1$. The simplest formal definition is the result of this recurrence relation:

$$\log^* n :=
\begin{cases}
0                  & \mbox{if } n \le 1; \\
1 + \log^*(\log n) & \mbox{if } n > 1
\end{cases}$$

In computer science, lg* is often used to indicate the binary iterated logarithm, which iterates the binary logarithm (with base $2$) instead of the natural logarithm (with base e). Mathematically, the iterated logarithm is well defined for any base greater than $e^{1/e} \approx 1.444667$, not only for base $2$ and base e. The "super-logarithm" function $\mathrm {slog}_b(n)$ is "essentially equivalent" to the base $b$ iterated logarithm (although differing in minor details of rounding) and forms an inverse to the operation of tetration.

== Analysis of algorithms ==
The iterated logarithm is useful in analysis of algorithms and computational complexity, appearing in the time and space complexity bounds of some algorithms such as:

- Finding the Delaunay triangulation of a set of points knowing the Euclidean minimum spanning tree: randomized O(n log* n) time.
- Fürer's algorithm for integer multiplication: O(n log n 2^{O(lg* n)}).
- Finding an approximate maximum (element at least as large as the median): lg* n − 1 ± 3 parallel operations.
- Richard Cole and Uzi Vishkin's distributed algorithm for 3-coloring an n-cycle: O(log* n) synchronous communication rounds.

The iterated logarithm grows at an extremely slow rate, much slower than the logarithm itself, or repeats of it. This is because the tetration grows much faster than iterated exponential:

$${^{y}b} = \underbrace{b^{b^{\cdot^{\cdot^{b}}}}}_y \gg \underbrace{b^{b^{\cdot^{\cdot^{b^{y}}}}}}_n$$

the inverse grows much slower: $\log_b^* x \ll \log_b^n x$.

For all values of n relevant to counting the running times of algorithms implemented in practice (i.e., n ≤ 2^{65536}, which is far more than the estimated number of atoms in the known universe), the iterated logarithm with base 2 has a value no more than 5.

The base-2 iterated logarithm
x	lg* x
(−∞, 1]	0
(1, 2]	1
(2, 4]	2
(4, 16]	3
(16, 65536]	4
(65536, 2^{65536}]	5

Higher bases give smaller iterated logarithms.

== Other applications ==
The iterated logarithm is closely related to the generalized logarithm function used in symmetric level-index arithmetic. The additive persistence of a number, the number of times someone must replace the number by the sum of its digits before reaching its digital root, is $O(\log^* n)$.

In computational complexity theory, Santhanam shows that the computational resources DTIME — computation time for a deterministic Turing machine — and NTIME — computation time for a non-deterministic Turing machine — are distinct up to $n\sqrt{\log^*n}.$

Gijswijt's sequence is known to be bounded above by $O(\log^*n)$. (The lower bound is $O(1)$, since every natural number has positive natural density in this sequence.)

== See also ==
- Inverse Ackermann function, an even more slowly growing function also used in computational complexity theory
