= Speed Up (disambiguation) =

Speed Up or Speedup may refer to:

== Computing ==
- Speedup or speed up, a metric for relative performance improvement established by Amdahl's law
- Speedup theorem, in computational complexity theory

== Music ==
- "Speed up", a song on the album Heart Attack by Krokus
- Speed Up / Slow Down, an EP by South
- "Speed Up" (Kara song), a song by Kara

== Other uses ==
- Speed up, a type of shot in the sport of pickleball
- Speed Up, an Italian motorcycle manufacturer

== See also ==
- Pitch control
