= Speedup theorem =

Computational theorem

In computational complexity theory, a speedup theorem is a theorem that for any algorithm (of a certain class) demonstrates the existence of a more efficient algorithm solving the same problem.

Examples:

- Linear speedup theorem, that the space and time requirements of a Turing machine solving a decision problem can be reduced by a multiplicative constant factor.
- Blum's speedup theorem, which provides speedup by any computable function (not just linear, as in the previous theorem).

== See also ==
- Amdahl's law, the theoretical speedup in latency of the execution of a task at a fixed workload that can be expected of a system whose resources are improved.
