= Information-based complexity =

Information-based complexity (IBC) studies optimal algorithms and computational complexity for the continuous problems that arise in physical science, economics, engineering, and mathematical finance.
