= EXPSPACE =

Set of decision problems

In computational complexity theory, EXPSPACE is the set of all decision problems solvable by a deterministic Turing machine in exponential space, i.e., in $O(2^{p(n)})$ space, where $p(n)$ is a polynomial function of $n$. Some authors restrict $p(n)$ to be a linear function, but most authors instead call the resulting class ESPACE. If we use a nondeterministic machine instead, we get the class NEXPSPACE, which is equal to EXPSPACE by Savitch's theorem.

A decision problem is EXPSPACE-complete if it is in EXPSPACE, and every problem in EXPSPACE has a polynomial-time many-one reduction to it. In other words, there is a polynomial-time algorithm that transforms instances of one to instances of the other with the same answer. EXPSPACE-complete problems might be thought of as the hardest problems in EXPSPACE.

EXPSPACE is a strict superset of PSPACE, NP, and P. It contains EXPTIME and is believed to strictly contain it, but this is unproven.

== Formal definition ==
In terms of DSPACE and NSPACE,

$$\mathsf{EXPSPACE} = \bigcup_{k\in\mathbb{N}} \mathsf{DSPACE}\left(2^{n^k}\right) = \bigcup_{k\in\mathbb{N}} \mathsf{NSPACE}\left(2^{n^k}\right)$$

== Examples of problems ==
=== Formal languages ===
An example of an EXPSPACE-complete problem is the problem of recognizing whether two regular expressions represent different languages, where the expressions are limited to four operators: union, concatenation, the Kleene star (zero or more copies of an expression), and squaring (two copies of an expression).

=== Logic ===
Alur and Henzinger extended linear temporal logic with times (integer) and prove that the validity problem of their logic is EXPSPACE-complete.

Reasoning in the first-order theory of the real numbers with +, ×, = is in EXPSPACE and was conjectured to be EXPSPACE-complete in 1986.

=== Petri nets ===
The coverability problem for Petri Nets is EXPSPACE-complete.

The reachability problem for Petri nets was known to be EXPSPACE-hard for a long time, but shown to be nonelementary, so probably not in EXPSPACE. In 2022 it was shown to be Ackermann-complete.

It is EXPSPACE-complete to decide whether the reachability of a given vector addition system is finite.

== See also ==
- Game complexity
