= NSPACE =

Memory space for a non-deterministic Turing machine

In computational complexity theory, non-deterministic space or NSPACE is the computational resource describing the memory space for a non-deterministic Turing machine. It is the non-deterministic counterpart of DSPACE.

== Complexity classes ==
The measure NSPACE is used to define the complexity class whose solutions can be determined by a non-deterministic Turing machine. The complexity class NSPACE(f(n)) is the set of decision problems that can be solved by a non-deterministic Turing machine, M, using space O(f(n)), where n is the length of the input.

Several important complexity classes can be defined in terms of NSPACE. These include:

- REG = DSPACE(O(1)) = NSPACE(O(1)), where REG is the class of regular languages (nondeterminism does not add power in constant space).
- NL = NSPACE(O(log n))
- CSL = NSPACE(O(n)), where CSL is the class of context-sensitive languages.
- PSPACE = NPSPACE = $\bigcup_{k\in\mathbb{N}} \mathsf{NSPACE}(n^k)$
- EXPSPACE = NEXPSPACE = $\bigcup_{k\in\mathbb{N}} \mathsf{NSPACE}(2^{n^k})$

The Immerman–Szelepcsényi theorem states that NSPACE(s(n)) is closed under complement for every function s(n) ≥ log n.

A further generalization is ASPACE, defined with alternating Turing machines.

== Relation with other complexity classes ==
=== DSPACE ===
NSPACE is the non-deterministic counterpart of DSPACE, the class of memory space on a deterministic Turing machine. First by definition, then by Savitch's theorem, we have that:

$\mathsf{DSPACE}[s(n)] \subseteq \mathsf{NSPACE}[s(n)] \subseteq \mathsf{DSPACE}[(s(n))^2].$

=== Time ===
NSPACE can also be used to bound the deterministic time complexity of a problem, by the following theorem:

If a language L is decided in space S(n) (where S(n) ≥ log n) by a non-deterministic Turing machine, then there exists a constant C such that L is decided in time O(C^{S(n)}) by a deterministic one.

== Limitations ==
The measure of space complexity in terms of DSPACE is useful because it represents the total amount of memory that an actual computer would need to solve a given computational problem with a given algorithm. The reason is that DSPACE describes the space complexity used by deterministic Turing machines, which can represent actual computers. On the other hand, NSPACE describes the space complexity of non-deterministic Turing machines, which are not useful when trying to represent actual computers. For this reason, NSPACE is limited in its usefulness to real-world applications.
