= Linear speedup theorem =

Speeding up Turing machines by increasing tape symbol complexity

In computational complexity theory, the linear speedup theorem for Turing machines states that one can always make a Turing machine complete its task with less steps, by allowing it to use more symbols (i.e. a larger alphabet) on its tape(s).

Formally, it states that given any real c > 0 and any Turing machine using k tape(s) solving a problem in time f(n), there is another such k-tape machine that solves the same problem in time at most f(n)/c + 2n + 3, where k > 1. If the original machine is non-deterministic, then the new machine is also non-deterministic. The constants 2 and 3 in 2n + 3 can be lowered, for example, to n + 2.

The theorem also holds for Turing machines with 1-way, read-only input tape and $k\ge 1$ work tapes.

For single-tape Turing machines, linear speedup holds for machines with execution time at least $n^2$. It provably does not hold for machines with time $t(n)\in \Omega(n\log n)\cap o(n^2)$.

== Proof ==
The construction is based on packing several tape symbols of the original machine M into one tape symbol of the new machine N. It has a similar effect as using longer words and commands in processors: it speeds up the computations but increases the machine size. How many old symbols are packed into a new symbol depends on the desired speed-up.

Suppose the new machine packs three old symbols into a new symbol. Then the alphabet of the new machine is $\Sigma \cup \Sigma^3$: it consists of the original symbols and the packed symbols. The new machine has the same number k > 1 of tapes. A state of N consists of the following components:

- the state of M;
- for each tape, three packed symbols that describe the packed symbol under the head, the packed symbol on the left, and the packed symbol on the right; and
- for each tape, the original head position within the packed symbol under the head of N.

The new machine N starts with encoding the given input into a new alphabet (that is why its alphabet must include $\Sigma$). For example, if the input to 2-tape M is on the left, then after the encoding the tape configuration of N is on the right:

[ #	_	a	b	b	a	b	b	a	_	...]	[ #	(_,_,_)	(_,_,_)	(_,_,_)	...]
[ #	_	_	_	_	_	_	_	_	_	...]	[ #	(_,a,b)	(b,a,b)	(b,a,_)	...]

The new machine packs three old symbols (e.g., the blank symbol _, the symbol a, and the symbol b) into a new symbol (here (_,a,b)) and copies it the second tape, while erasing the first tape. At the end of the initialization, the new machine directs its head to the beginning. Overall, this takes 2n + 3 steps.

After the initialization, the state of N is $(q_0; ~~~?, (\_,\_,\_), ?; ~~~?, (\_,a,b), ?; ~~~ [1,1])$, where the symbol $?$ means that it will be filled in by the machine later; the symbol $[1,1]$ means that the head of the original machine points to the first symbols inside $(\_,\_,\_)$ and $(\_,a,b)$. Now the machine starts simulating m = 3 transitions of M using six of its own transitions (in this concrete case, there will be no speed up, but in general m can be much larger than six). Let the configurations of M and N be:

[ #	_	_	b	b	a	b	b	a	_	...]	[ #	(_,a,b)	(b,a,b)	(b,_,_)	...]
[ #	_	a	b	b	a	b	b	_	_	...]	[ #	(_,_,b)	(b,a,b)	(b,a,_)	...]

where the bold symbols indicate the head position. The state of N is $(q; ~~~?, (\_,\_,b), ?; ~~~?, (b,\_,\_), ?; ~~~ [3,1])$. Now the following happens:

- N moves right, left, left, right. After the four moves, the machine N has all its $?$ filled, and its state becomes $(q; ~~~\#, (\_,\_,b), (b,a,b); ~~~(b,a,b), (b,\_,\_), (\_,\_,\_); ~~~ [3,1])$
- Now N updates its symbols and state according to m = 3 transitions of the original machine. This may require two moves (update the current symbol and update one of its adjacent symbols). Suppose the original machine moves as follows (with the corresponding configuration of N on the right):

[ #	_	_	_	_	_	b	b	a	_	...]	[ #	(_,a,b)	(b,_,_)	(_,_,_)	...]
[ #	_	a	b	b	_	_	_	_	_	...]	[ #	(_,_,_)	(_,_,b)	(b,a,_)	...]

Thus, the state of N becomes $(q'; ~~~?, (\_,\_,b), ?; ~~~?, (b,\_,\_), ?; ~~~ [3,1])$.

=== Complexity ===
Initialization requires 2n + 3 steps. In the simulation, 6 steps of N simulate m steps of M. Choosing m > 6c produces the running time bounded by $f(n)/c + 2n + 3.$

== Tape compression ==
The proof of the speedup theorem clearly hinges on the capability to compress storage by replacing the alphabet with a larger one. Specifically, it depends on the tape compression theorem:

If a language $L$ is accepted by a Turing machine within space $s(n)$, then for any $c > 0$, there exists some Turing machine that accepts it within space $c \cdot s(n)$. The same holds for non-deterministic Turing machines.

For non-deterministic single-tape Turing machines of time complexity $T(n) \ge n^2$, linear speedup can be achieved without increasing the alphabet.

== Dependence on the shape of storage ==
Regan considered a property of a computational model called information vicinity. This property is related to the memory structure: a Turing machine has linear vicinity, while a Kolmogorov-Uspenskii machine and other pointer machines have an exponential one. Regan’s thesis is that the existence of linear speedup has to do with having a polynomial information vicinity. The salient point in this claim is that a model with exponential vicinity will not have speedup even if changing the alphabet is allowed (for models with a discrete memory that stores symbols). Regan did not, however, prove any general theorem of this kind. Hühne proved that if we require the speedup to be obtained by an on-line simulation (which is the case for the speedup on ordinary Turing machines), then linear speedup does not exist on machines with tree storage.
