= Computational resource =

Aspect of computational complexity theory

In computational complexity theory, a computational resource is a resource used by some computational models in the solution of computational problems.

The simplest computational resources are computation time, the number of steps necessary to solve a problem, and memory space, the amount of storage needed while solving the problem, but many more complicated resources have been defined.

A computational problem is generally defined in terms of its action on any valid input. Examples of problems might be "given an integer n, determine whether n is prime", or "given two numbers x and y, calculate the product x*y". As the inputs get bigger, the amount of computational resources needed to solve a problem will increase. Thus, the resources needed to solve a problem are described in terms of asymptotic analysis, by identifying the resources as a function of the length or size of the input. Resource usage is often partially quantified using Big O notation.

Computational resources are useful because we can study which problems can be computed in a certain amount of each computational resource. In this way, we can determine whether algorithms for solving the problem are optimal and we can make statements about an algorithm's efficiency. The set of all of the computational problems that can be solved using a certain amount of a certain computational resource is a complexity class, and relationships between different complexity classes are one of the most important topics in complexity theory.

== Describing generally accessible computing equipment ==
The term "Computational resource" is commonly used to describe accessible computing equipment and software. See Utility computing.

== Formal quantification of computing capability ==
There has been some effort to formally quantify computing capability. A bounded Turing machine has been used to model specific computations using the number of state transitions and alphabet size to quantify the computational effort required to solve a particular problem.

== See also ==
- Compute (machine learning)
