= List of complexity classes =

A representation of the relation among complexity classes

This is a list of complexity classes in computational complexity theory. For other computational and complexity subjects, see list of computability and complexity topics.

Many of these classes have a 'co' partner which consists of the complements of all languages in the original class. For example, if a language L is in NP then the complement of L is in co-NP. (This does not mean that the complement of NP is co-NP—there are languages which are known to be in both, and other languages which are known to be in neither.)

"The hardest problems" of a class refer to problems which belong to the class such that every other problem of that class can be reduced to it.

#P	Count solutions to an NP problem
#P-complete	The hardest problems in #P
2-EXPTIME	Solvable in doubly exponential time
AC^{0}	A circuit complexity class of bounded depth
ACC^{0}	A circuit complexity class of bounded depth and counting gates
AC	A circuit complexity class
AH	The arithmetic hierarchy
AP	The class of problems alternating Turing machines can solve in polynomial time.
APX	Optimization problems that have approximation algorithms with constant approximation ratio
AM	Solvable in polynomial time by an Arthur–Merlin protocol
BPP	Solvable in polynomial time by randomized algorithms (answer is probably right)
BPL	problems solvable in logarithmic space and polynomial time with probabilistic Turing machines with two-sided error
BQP	Solvable in polynomial time on a quantum computer (answer is probably right)
co-NP	"NO" answers checkable in polynomial time by a non-deterministic machine
co-NP-complete	The hardest problems in co-NP
DLIN	Solvable by a deterministic multitape Turing machine in time O(n).
DSPACE(f(n))	Solvable by a deterministic machine with space O(f(n)).
DTIME(f(n))	Solvable by a deterministic machine in time O(f(n)).
E	Solvable in exponential time with linear exponent
ELEMENTARY	The union of the classes in the exponential hierarchy
ESPACE	Solvable with exponential space with linear exponent
EXP	Same as EXPTIME
EXPSPACE	Solvable with exponential space
EXPTIME	Solvable in exponential time
FNP	The analogue of NP for function problems
FP	The analogue of P for function problems
FP^{NP}	The analogue of P^{NP} for function problems; the home of the traveling salesman problem
FPT	Fixed-parameter tractable
GapL	Logspace-reducible to computing the integer determinant of a matrix
IP	Solvable in polynomial time by an interactive proof system
L	Solvable with logarithmic (small) space
LOGCFL	Logspace-reducible to a context-free language
MA	Solvable in polynomial time by a Merlin–Arthur protocol
NC	Solvable efficiently (in polylogarithmic time) on parallel computers
NE	Solvable by a non-deterministic machine in exponential time with linear exponent
NESPACE	Solvable by a non-deterministic machine with exponential space with linear exponent
NEXP	Same as NEXPTIME
NEXPSPACE	Solvable by a non-deterministic machine with exponential space
NEXPTIME	Solvable by a non-deterministic machine in exponential time
NL	"YES" answers checkable with logarithmic space
NLIN	Solvable by a nondeterministic multitape Turing machine in time O(n).
NONELEMENTARY	Complement of ELEMENTARY.
NP	"YES" answers checkable in polynomial time (see complexity classes P and NP)
NP-complete	The hardest or most expressive problems in NP
NP-easy	Analogue to P^{NP} for function problems; another name for FP^{NP}
NP-equivalent	The hardest problems in FP^{NP}
NP-hard	At least as hard as every problem in NP but not known to be in the same complexity class
NSPACE(f(n))	Solvable by a non-deterministic machine with space O(f(n)).
NTIME(f(n))	Solvable by a non-deterministic machine in time O(f(n)).
P	Solvable in polynomial time
P-complete	The hardest problems in P to solve on parallel computers
P/poly	Solvable in polynomial time given an "advice string" depending only on the input size
PCP	Probabilistically Checkable Proof
PH	The union of the classes in the polynomial hierarchy
PL	solvable in polynomial time with a logarithmic space randomized machine with probability > ^{1}/_{2}
P^{NP}	Solvable in polynomial time with an oracle for a problem in NP; also known as Δ_{2}P
PP	Probabilistically Polynomial (answer is right with probability slightly more than 1/2)
PPAD	Polynomial Parity Arguments on Directed graphs
PR	Solvable by recursively building up arithmetic functions.
PSPACE	Solvable with polynomial space.
PSPACE-complete	The hardest problems in PSPACE.
PTAS	Polynomial-time approximation scheme (a subclass of APX).
QIP	Solvable in polynomial time by a quantum interactive proof system.
QMA	Quantum analog of NP.
R	Solvable in a finite amount of time.
RE	Problems to which we can answer "YES" in a finite amount of time, but a "NO" answer might never come.
RL	Solvable with logarithmic space by randomized algorithms (NO answer is probably right, YES is certainly right)
RP	Solvable in polynomial time by randomized algorithms (NO answer is probably right, YES is certainly right)
SL	Problems log-space reducible to determining if a path exist between given vertices in an undirected graph. In October 2004 it was discovered that this class is in fact equal to L.
S_{2}P	one round games with simultaneous moves refereed deterministically in polynomial time
TFNP	Total function problems solvable in non-deterministic polynomial time. A problem in this class has the property that every input has an output whose validity may be checked efficiently, and the computational challenge is to find a valid output.
UP	Unambiguous Non-Deterministic Polytime functions.
ZPL	Solvable by randomized algorithms (answer is always right, average space usage is logarithmic)
ZPP	Solvable by randomized algorithms (answer is always right, average running time is polynomial)
