= NL-complete =

In computational complexity theory, NL-complete is a complexity class containing the languages that are complete for NL, the class of decision problems that can be solved by a nondeterministic Turing machine using a logarithmic amount of memory space. The NL-complete languages are the most "difficult" or "expressive" problems in NL. If a deterministic algorithm exists for solving any one of the NL-complete problems in logarithmic memory space, then NL = L.

== Definitions ==
NL consists of the decision problems that can be solved by a nondeterministic Turing machine with a read-only input tape and a separate read-write tape whose size is limited to be proportional to the logarithm of the input length. Similarly, L consists of the languages that can be solved by a deterministic Turing machine with the same assumptions about tape length. Because there are only a polynomial number of distinct configurations of these machines, both L and NL are subsets of the class P of deterministic polynomial-time decision problems.

Formally, a decision problem is NL-complete when it belongs to NL, and has the additional property that every other decision problem in NL can be reduced to it. Unless otherwise specified, the reductions in this definition are assumed to be many-one reductions by a deterministic logarithmic-space algorithm.

== Properties ==
If an NL-complete language X could belong to L, then so would every other language Y in NL. For, suppose (by NL-completeness) that there existed a deterministic logspace reduction r that maps an instance y of problem Y to an instance x of problem X, and also (by the assumption that X is in L) that there exists a deterministic logspace algorithm A for solving problem X. With these assumptions, a problem y in language Y could be solved in logarithmic space by an algorithm that simulates the behavior of algorithm A on input r(y), using the reduction algorithm to simulate each access to the read-only tape for r(y).

It follows from the Immerman–Szelepcsényi theorem that, if a language is co-NL-complete (that is, if its complement is NL-complete) then the language is also NL-complete itself.

== Examples ==
One important NL-complete problem is ST-connectivity (or "Reachability"), the problem of determining whether, given a directed graph G and two nodes s and t on that graph, there is a path from s to t. ST-connectivity can be seen to be in NL, because we start at the node s and nondeterministically walk to every other reachable node. ST-connectivity can be seen to be NL-hard by considering the computation state graph of any other NL algorithm, and considering that the other algorithm will accept if and only if there is a (nondetermistic) path from the starting state to an accepting state.

Another important NL-complete problem is 2-satisfiability, the problem of determining whether a boolean formula in conjunctive normal form with two variables per clause is satisfiable.

The problem of unique decipherability of a given variable-length code was shown to be co-NL-complete by Rytter (1986); Rytter used a variant of the Sardinas–Patterson algorithm to show that the complementary problem, finding a string that has multiple ambiguous decodings, belongs to NL. Because of the Immerman–Szelepcsényi theorem, it follows that unique decipherability is also NL-complete.

Other NL-complete problems include:

- generation of elements by an associative binary operation
- solving systems of linear equations with two variables per equation
- equivalence of generalized sequential machines with final states
- deciding the LL(k) and LR(k) conditions for context-free grammars
- determining whether a directed graph is strongly connected
- determining whether a directed graph contains a directed cycle
- acceptability problem of nondeterministic finite automata
- certain context-free languages

Additional NL-complete problems on propositional logic, algebra, linear system, graph, finite automata, context-free grammar are listed by Jones, Lien, and Lasser.

== Bibliography ==
- Papadimitriou, Christos H. (1994). Computational Complexity. Reading, Massachusetts: Addison-Wesley. ISBN 0-201-53082-1.
