= LOGCFL =

Computational complexity class

In computational complexity theory, LOGCFL is the complexity class that contains all decision problems that can be reduced in logarithmic space to a context-free language. This class is closed under complementation. It is situated between NL and AC^{1}, in the sense that it contains the former and is contained in the latter. Problems that are complete for LOGCFL include many problems that can be characterized by acyclic hypergraphs:

- evaluating acyclic Boolean conjunctive queries
- checking the existence of a homomorphism between two acyclic relational structures
- checking the existence of solutions of acyclic constraint satisfaction problems

LOGCFL is the set of decision problems solvable by nondeterministic auxiliary pushdown automata in log space and polynomial time.

== See also ==
- List of complexity classes
