= Walter Savitch =

American computer scientist (1943–2021)

- Born: Walter John Savitch; February 21, 1943
- Died: February 1, 2021 (aged 77)
- Education: University of California, Berkeley
- Known for: Savitch's theorem, NL
- Scientific career
- Fields: Computer science
- Workplaces: University of California, San Diego
- Thesis: Nondeterministic Tape Bounded Turing Machines (1969)
- Doctoral advisor: Stephen Cook
- Website: www-cse.ucsd.edu/users/savitch/

Walter John Savitch (February 21, 1943 – February 1, 2021) was an American computer scientist. He was best known for defining the complexity class NL (nondeterministic logarithmic space), and for Savitch's theorem, which defines a relationship between the NSPACE and DSPACE complexity classes. His work in establishing complexity classes has helped to create the background against which non-deterministic and probabilistic reasoning can be performed.

He also did extensive work in the field of natural language processing and mathematical linguistics. He was focused on computational complexity as it applies to genetics and biology for over 10 years.

Aside from his work in theoretical computer science, Savitch wrote a number of textbooks for learning to program in C/C++, Java, Ada, Pascal and others.

Savitch received his PhD in mathematics from University of California, Berkeley in 1969 under the supervision of Stephen Cook. Since then he was a professor at University of California, San Diego in the computer science department.
