= St-connectivity =

There is a path directed from "s" to "t" in the first graph, but not in the second.

In computer science, st-connectivity or STCON is a decision problem asking, for vertices s and t in a directed graph, if t is reachable from s.

Formally, the decision problem is given by

PATH = {⟨D, s, t⟩ | D is a directed graph with a path from vertex s to t}.

== Complexity ==
On a sequential computer, st-connectivity can easily be solved in linear time by either depth-first search or breadth-first search. The interest in this problem in computational complexity concerns its complexity with respect to more limited forms of computation. For instance, the complexity class of problems that can be solved by a non-deterministic Turing machine using only a logarithmic amount of memory is called NL. The st-connectivity problem can be shown to be in NL, as a non-deterministic Turing machine can guess the next node of the path, while the only information which has to be stored is the total length of the path and which node is currently under consideration. The algorithm terminates if either the target node t is reached, or the length of the path so far exceeds n, the number of nodes in the graph.

The complement of st-connectivity, known as st-non-connectivity, is also in the class NL, since NL = coNL by the Immerman–Szelepcsényi theorem.

In particular, the problem of st-connectivity is actually NL-complete, that is, every problem in the class NL is reducible to connectivity under a log-space reduction. This remains true for the stronger case of first-order reductions (Immerman 1999, p. 51). The log-space reduction from any language in NL to STCON proceeds as follows: Consider the non-deterministic log-space Turing machine M that accepts a language in NL. Since there is only logarithmic space on the work tape, all possible states of the Turing machine (where a state is the state of the internal finite state machine, the position of the head and the contents of the work tape) are polynomially many. Map all possible states of the deterministic log-space machine to vertices of a graph, and put an edge between u and v if the state v can be reached from u within one step of the non-deterministic machine. Now the problem of whether the machine accepts is the same as the problem of whether there exists a path from the start state to the accepting state.

Savitch's theorem guarantees that the algorithm can be simulated in O(log^{2} n) deterministic space.

The same problem for undirected graphs is called undirected s-t connectivity and was shown to be in L by Omer Reingold. This research won him the 2005 Grace Murray Hopper Award. Undirected st-connectivity was previously known to be complete for the class SL, so Reingold's work showed that SL is the same class as L. On alternating graphs, the problem is P-complete (Immerman 1999, p. 54).
