= First Order =

First Order may refer to:

- First-order, a term used in mathematics and logic
- First order (religious), an institute of consecrated life for men
  - First Order of Saint Francis, one such grouping
- First Order (Star Wars), a fictional autocratic military dictatorship
- "First Order", a 2016 Fate/Grand Order animated production
- "First Order", an Order of Knowledge (Persian: نشان دانش) badge of honor in Iran established in the Qajar dynasty era
