= Cem Say =

Turkish computer scientist

Ahmet Celal Cem Say (born 14 March 1966 in Ankara) is a Turkish theoretical computer scientist and professor of computer science. He is a full time professor at the Kadir Has University Department of Computer Engineering in Istanbul, Turkey. Cem Say is the author of the QSI algorithm for qualitative system identification, an AI task relevant in the study of qualitative reasoning. His work in complexity theory includes studies on small-space quantum finite-state machines and new characterizations of the complexity classes NL and P in terms of verifiers modeled by finite-state machines allowed to use only a fixed number of random bits. He is also known for his advocacy of people wrongly accused with forged digital evidence, his legal battles with the administration of Boğaziçi University, and his popular science books.

== Education ==
Cem Say was born in Ankara in 1966. He finished the high school TED Ankara College in 1983. He graduated from Boğaziçi University's Department of Computer Engineering in 1987. He received his PhD in the same department under the supervision of Selahattin Kuru in 1992.

== Academic career ==
Cem Say was a full-time professor at the Department of Computer Engineering in Boğaziçi University between 1992 and 2026. Presently, he is a professor at the Department of Computer Engineering in Kadir Has University. He has been an active researcher, having published more than 100 scientific manuscripts with more than 1300 citations.

== Research areas ==
His research interests include theoretical computer science, quantum computing, artificial intelligence and natural language understanding.

=== Representative scientific publications ===
- A.C.C. Say, S. Kuru "Qualitative system identification: deriving structure from behavior". Artificial Intelligence 83 (1), 75–141
- A. Yakaryılmaz, A.C.C. Say "Unbounded-error quantum computation with small space bounds". Information and Computation 209 (6), 873–892

== Work in popular media ==
Cem Say has an active profile in popular media. He has delivered several TEDx conference talks in Turkey on artificial intelligence and robots. He has appeared many times in national television channels in Turkey as a popular science commentator. He has authored three popular science books in Turkish: 50 Soruda Yapay Zekâ (Artificial Intelligence in 50 Questions), Yeni Dünya, Yeni Ağ (New World, New Web), and En Hakiki Mürşit (The Truest Guide). He has a weekly column on science-related topics in the weekly newspaper Oksijen. He has an active Twitter presence, where he tweets on a daily basis on popular science and current political issues.
