= BPL (complexity) =

Concept in computational complexity theory

In computational complexity theory, BPL (Bounded-error Probabilistic Logarithmic-space), sometimes called BPLP (Bounded-error Probabilistic Logarithmic-space Polynomial-time), is the complexity class of problems solvable in logarithmic space and polynomial time with probabilistic Turing machines with two-sided error. It is named in analogy with BPP, which is similar but has no logarithmic space restriction.

== Error model ==
The probabilistic Turing machines in the definition of BPL may only accept or reject incorrectly less than 1/3 of the time; this is called two-sided error. The constant 1/3 is arbitrary; any x with 0 ≤ x < 1/2 would suffice. This error can be made 2^{−p(x)} times smaller for any polynomial p(x) without using more than polynomial time or logarithmic space by running the algorithm repeatedly.

== Related classes ==
Since two-sided error is more general than one-sided error, RL and its complement co-RL are contained in BPL. BPL is also contained in PL, which is similar except that the error bound is 1/2, instead of a constant less than 1/2; like the class PP, the class PL is less practical because it may require a large number of rounds to reduce the error probability to a small constant.

Nisan (1994) showed the weak derandomization result that BPL is contained in SC. SC is the class of problems solvable in polynomial time and polylogarithmic space on a deterministic Turing machine; in other words, this result shows that, given polylogarithmic space, a deterministic machine can simulate logarithmic space probabilistic algorithms.

BPL is contained in NC and in L/poly. Saks and Zhou showed that BPL is contained in DSPACE(log^{3/2} n), and in 2021 Hoza improved this to show BPL is contained in DSPACE $(\log^{3/2}(n)/\sqrt{\log \log n})$. On October 6, 2026, the OpenAI bulk release of mathematical papers included a paper, together with a formalization in Lean, claiming the equality L = BPL.
