= RL (complexity) =

Complexity class in computer science

Randomized Logarithmic-space (RL), sometimes called RLP (Randomized Logarithmic-space Polynomial-time), is the complexity class of computational complexity theory problems solvable in logarithmic space and polynomial time with probabilistic Turing machines with one-sided error. It is named in analogy with RP, which is similar but has no logarithmic space restriction.

== Definition ==
RL never accept incorrectly but are allowed to reject incorrectly less than 1/3 of the time; this is called one-sided error. The constant 1/3 is arbitrary; any x with 0 < x < 1 would suffice. This error can be made 2^{−p(x)} times smaller for any polynomial p(x) without using more than polynomial time or logarithmic space by running the algorithm repeatedly.

== Relation to other complexity classes ==
Sometimes the name RL is reserved for the class of problems solvable by logarithmic-space probabilistic machines in unbounded time. However, this class can be shown to be equal to NL using a probabilistic counter, and so is usually referred to as NL instead; this also shows that RL is contained in NL. RL is contained in BPL, which is similar but allows two-sided error (incorrect accepts). RL contains L, the problems solvable by deterministic Turing machines in log space, since its definition is just more general.

Noam Nisan showed in 1992 the weak derandomization result that RL is contained in SC, the class of problems solvable in polynomial time and polylogarithmic space on a deterministic Turing machine; in other words, given polylogarithmic space, a deterministic machine can simulate logarithmic space probabilistic algorithms.

It is believed that RL is equal to L, that is, that polynomial-time logspace computation can be completely derandomized; major evidence for this was presented by Reingold et al. in 2005. A proof of this is the holy grail of the efforts in the field of unconditional derandomization of complexity classes. A major step forward was Omer Reingold's proof that SL is equal to L. On October 6, 2026, the OpenAI bulk release of mathematical papers included a paper, together with a formalization in Lean, claiming the stronger equality L = RL = BPL.
