= ESPACE =

In computational complexity theory, the complexity class ESPACE is the set of decision problems that can be solved by a deterministic Turing machine in space 2^{O(n)}.

See also EXPSPACE.
