= First-order =

In mathematics and other formal sciences, first-order or first order most often means either:

- "linear" (a polynomial of degree at most one), as in first-order approximation and other calculus uses, where it is contrasted with "polynomials of higher degree", or
- "without self-reference", as in first-order logic and other logic uses, where it is contrasted with "allowing some self-reference" (higher-order logic)

In detail, it may refer to:

== Mathematics ==
- First-order approximation
- First-order arithmetic
- First-order condition
- First-order hold, a mathematical model of the practical reconstruction of sampled signals
- First-order inclusion probability
- First Order Inductive Learner, a rule-based learning algorithm
- First-order reduction, a very weak type of reduction between two computational problems
- First-order resolution
- First-order stochastic dominance
- First order stream

=== Differential equations ===
- Exact first-order ordinary differential equation
- First-order differential equation
- First-order differential operator
- First-order linear differential equation
- First-order non-singular perturbation theory
- First-order partial differential equation, a partial differential equation that involves only first derivatives of the unknown function of n variables
- Order of accuracy

=== Logic ===
- First-order language
- First-order logic, a formal logical system used in mathematics, philosophy, linguistics, and computer science
- First-order predicate, a predicate that takes only individual(s) constants or variables as argument(s)
- First-order predicate calculus
- First-order theorem provers
- First-order theory
- Monadic first-order logic

== Chemistry ==
- First-order fluid, another name for a power-law fluid with exponential dependence of viscosity on temperature
- First-order reaction, a first-order chemical reaction
- First-order transition

== Computer science ==
- First-order abstract syntax
- First-order function
- First-order query

== Other uses ==
- First-order desire
- First-order election, in political science, the relative importance of certain elections
- First order Fresnel lens

== See also ==
- First Order (disambiguation)
- Original order, the first ordering
