= Advice (complexity) =

Computational input that relies on the length but not content of the input

In computational complexity theory, an advice string is an extra input to a Turing machine that is allowed to depend on the length n of the input, but not on the input itself. A decision problem is in the complexity class P/f(n) if there is a polynomial time Turing machine M with the following property: for any n, there is an advice string A of length f(n) such that, for any input x of length n, the machine M correctly decides the problem on the input x, given x and A.

The most common complexity class involving advice is P/poly where advice length f(n) can be any polynomial in n. P/poly is equal to the class of decision problems such that, for every n, there exists a polynomial size Boolean circuit correctly deciding the problem on all inputs of length n. One direction of the equivalence is easy to see. If, for every n, there is a polynomial size Boolean circuit A(n) deciding the problem, we can use a Turing machine that interprets the advice string as a description of the circuit. Then, given the description of A(n) as the advice, the machine will correctly decide the problem on all inputs of length n. The other direction uses a simulation of a polynomial-time Turing machine by a polynomial-size circuit as in one proof of Cook's theorem. Simulating a Turing machine with advice is no more complicated than simulating an ordinary machine, since the advice string can be incorporated into the circuit.

Because of this equivalence, P/poly is sometimes defined as the class of decision problems solvable by polynomial size Boolean circuits, or by polynomial-size non-uniform Boolean circuits.

P/poly contains both P and BPP (Adleman's theorem). It also contains some undecidable problems, such as the unary version of every undecidable problem, including the halting problem. Because of that, it is not contained in DTIME (f(n)) or NTIME (f(n)) for any f.

Advice classes can be defined for other resource bounds instead of P. For example, taking a non-deterministic polynomial time Turing machine with an advice of length f(n) gives the complexity class NP/f(n). If we are allowed an advice of length 2^{n}, we can use it to encode whether each input of length n is contained in the language. Therefore, any boolean function is computable with an advice of length 2^{n} and advice of more than exponential length is not meaningful.

Similarly, the class L/poly can be defined as deterministic logspace with a polynomial amount of advice.

Known results include:

- The classes NL/poly and UL/poly are the same, i.e. nondeterministic logarithmic space computation with advice can be made unambiguous. This may be proved using an isolation lemma.
- It is known that coNEXP is contained in NEXP/poly.
- If NP is contained in P/poly, then the polynomial time hierarchy collapses (Karp-Lipton theorem).
