= NLIN =

In computational complexity theory, NLIN is the class of decision problems that can be solved by a nondeterministic multitape Turing machine in linear time. It is known that this class differs from its deterministic counterpart, DLIN.
