= Róbert Szelepcsényi =

Slovak computer scientist

Róbert Szelepcsényi (Slovak pronunciation: [ˈrɔːbert ˈseleptʂeːɲi]; born 19 August 1966, Žilina) is a Slovak computer scientist of Hungarian ethnicity and a member of the Faculty of Mathematics, Physics and Informatics of Comenius University in Bratislava.

His results on the closure of non-deterministic space under complement, independently obtained in 1987 also by Neil Immerman (the result known as the Immerman–Szelepcsényi theorem), brought the Gödel Prize of ACM and EATCS to both of them in 1995.

== Scientific articles ==
- Róbert Szelepcsényi: The Method of Forced Enumeration for Nondeterministic Automata. Acta Informatica 26(3): 279-284 (1988)
