= DLIN =

In computational complexity theory, DLIN is the class of decision problems that can be solved by a multitape Turing machine in linear time, O(n). It is known that this class differs from its nondeterministic counterpart, NLIN.
