= Elaine Rich =

American computer scientist

Elaine Alice Rich is an American computer scientist, known for her textbooks on artificial intelligence and automata theory and for her research on user modeling. She is retired as a distinguished senior lecturer from the University of Texas at Austin.

== Education and career ==
Rich is the daughter of applied mathematician Robert Peter Rich. She majored in linguistics and applied mathematics at Brown University, graduating magna cum laude in 1972. She completed her Ph.D. at Carnegie Mellon University in 1979. Her doctoral dissertation, Building and Exploiting User Models, was supervised by George G. Robertson.

She joined the University of Texas at Austin as an assistant professor in 1979, but in 1985 moved to the Microelectronics and Computer Technology Corporation (MCC) as a researcher in the Human Interface Laboratory and Knowledge-Based Natural Language Project. At MCC she became director of the Artificial Intelligence Laboratory in 1988. She left MCC in 1993. In 1998 she returned to the University of Texas as an adjunct associate professor, and in 2000 became a senior lecturer. During her time at UT, she developed an interactive textbook, FREGE (Fundamentals of Reasoning for the Electronic Age), which was utilized in a course at the university. She retired from UT at the end of 2016.

== Books ==
Rich is the author of:

- Artificial Intelligence (McGraw-Hill, 1983; 2nd ed., with K. Knight, 1991; 3rd. ed, with K. Knight and S. B. Nair, 2009)
- Automata, Computability, and Complexity: Theory and Applications (Prentice-Hall, 2008)

== Recognition ==
Rich was named a Fellow of the Association for the Advancement of Artificial Intelligence in 1991.
