= Büchi–Elgot–Trakhtenbrot theorem =

Formal language theorem

In formal language theory, the Büchi–Elgot–Trakhtenbrot theorem states that a language is regular if and only if it can be defined by a formula in monadic second-order logic (MSO). The theorem is due to Julius Richard Büchi, Calvin Elgot, and Boris Trakhtenbrot.

Since a language is regular if and only if it can be defined as the accepted language of a finite-state automaton, a more precise statement of the theorem is that for every MSO formula defining a formal language, we can find a finite-state automaton defining the same language, and for every finite-state automaton, we can find an MSO formula defining the same language.

== Examples ==
Regular languages are usually described by regular expressions. For instance, $(ab)^*$ represents the regular language of words where the pattern $ab$ is repeated:

$$\epsilon, ab, abab, ababab, abababab, \ldots$$

The same language is represented by the following monadic second-order logic formula (in this case a first-order logic formula). The variables represent word indices (positions), and the predicate $S(x, y)$ denotes the successor relation $y = x + 1$.

$$\begin{array}{l}
(\exists x \; \forall y \; \lnot S(y, x) \land a(x)) \\
\land (\exists x \; \forall y \; \lnot S(x, y) \land b(x)) \\
\land (\forall x \forall y \; (S(x,y) \land a(x)) \rightarrow b(y)) \\
\land (\forall x \forall y \; (S(x,y) \land b(x)) \rightarrow a(y)) \\
\end{array}$$

In words:

- There is a position $x$ which is the beginning of the word and has letter $a$.
- There is a position $x$ which is the end of the word and has letter $b$.
- Any position following a letter $a$ must have letter $b$.
- Any position following a letter $b$ must have letter $a$.

A second example is the regular expression $(aa)^*$. This language cannot be expressed in first-order logic and needs the second-order quantification of MSO. We introduce an $\text{EVEN}$ predicate that is exactly true on positions that are even. The following MSO formula says that all letters are $a$, that $\text{EVEN}$ is true at every even index, and that $\text{EVEN}$ is true at the ending position.

$$\begin{array}{l}
(\forall x \; a(x)) \land \exists \text{EVEN} \\
(\exists x \; \forall y \; \lnot S(y, x) \land \lnot \text{EVEN}(x)) \\
\land (\exists x \; \forall y \; \lnot S(x, y) \land \text{EVEN}(x)) \\
\land (\forall x \forall y \; (S(x,y) \land \text{EVEN}(x)) \rightarrow \lnot\text{EVEN}(y)) \\
\land (\forall x \forall y \; (S(x,y) \land \lnot\text{EVEN}(x)) \rightarrow \text{EVEN}(y)) \\
\end{array}$$

== Setup ==
Let $\Sigma$ be a finite nonempty set, called the alphabet. A formal language is a subset of $\Sigma^*$, the set of finite-length strings formed by elements of $\Sigma$. A language is regular if and only if it is accepted by a finite-state automaton.

In order to define languages using logical formulas, we need the following logical formalism. Other than the first-order logic symbols, it also has the following predicates:

- The equality relation $=$.
- One monadic relation $Q_a$ per letter $a \in \Sigma$, where $Q_a(x)$ means "location $x$ contains letter $a$".
- The successor relation $S(x, y)$, meaning "location $x$ is immediately followed by location $y$".
  - Since in MSO logic we can quantify over all monadic predicates, the successor relation can be used to define an ordering relation $x < y$ as the transitive closure of $S(x, y)$:
    $$\neg x = y \wedge \forall X (X(x) \wedge \forall z, z' (X(z) \wedge S(z, z') \to X(z') ) \to X(y))$$
    This construction is similar to the induction principle in Peano arithmetic.

With this formalism, one can characterize a language by a single MSO formula $\sigma$. Specifically, $\sigma$ defines the set $L_\sigma := \{w \in \Sigma^* : M_w \models \sigma\}$. In this definition, to each word $w \in \Sigma^*$, we define a finite model $M_w$ with the following conditions:

- The universe of $M_w$ is $\{1, 2, \dots, |w|\}$.
- For each $n \in \{1, 2, \dots, |w|\}$, we have $M_w \models Q_a(n)$ if and only if $w_n = a$.
- For each $n,m \in \{1, 2, \dots, |w|\}$, we have $M_w \models S(n,m)$ if and only if $m = n+1$.

Any such language $L_\sigma$ is said to be MSO-expressible.

== Theorem statement ==
A language $L \subseteq \Sigma^*$ is regular iff it is MSO-expressible.

== Proof overview ==
=== Regular implies MSO-expressible ===
Given a regular language $L$, it is specified by a finite-state automaton with $k$ states. Then, one constructs a MSO formula of the form $\exists X_1, \dots, X_k, \phi(X_1, \dots, X_k)$. Here, each $X_i$ is supposed to be interpreted as the set of locations at which the automaton is at state $i$. The formula $\phi(X_1, \dots, X_k)$ then expresses the following:

- Any location belongs to exactly one of $X_1, \dots, X_k$, and
- the state transition at each location follows the automaton's edge rules, and
- the last location is in one of the accepting states.

More concretely, we can construct the formula as a conjunction of the following:

- $\forall x, \bigvee_{i: 1 \leq i \leq n}\left(X_i(x)\wedge\bigwedge_{j : j \neq i, 1 \leq j \leq n} \neg X_j(x)\right)$.
- $\forall x, y, S(x, y) \to \bigvee_{i: 1 \leq i \leq n, a \in \Sigma} X_i(x) \wedge Q_a(x) \wedge X_{A(i, a)}(y)$, where we use $A(i, a)$ to mean: the state you arrive at, if you start at state $i$ on the automaton and follow the edge for letter $a$.
  - In this part, we assume that the automaton is deterministic. This can be generalized easily to the nondeterministic case.
- $\forall x (\neg\exists y S(x, y)) \to \bigvee_{a \in \text{accepting states}} Q_a(x)$.

=== MSO-expressible implies regular ===
Conversely, to show that each MSO formula defines a language that is regular, it suffices to induct over the syntax of MSO formulas. This boils down to induction over $\neg, \wedge$, and existential quantification over monadic predicates. These correspond to complement, intersection, and projection (a restricted kind of homomorphism). The set of regular languages over $\Sigma$ is closed under complement, intersection, and projection.

== See also ==
- Trakhtenbrot's theorem
- Courcelle's theorem
