= Martin Grohe =

German mathematician and computer scientist

Martin Grohe (born 1967) is a German mathematician and computer scientist known for his research on parameterized complexity, mathematical logic, finite model theory, the logic of graphs, database theory, descriptive complexity theory, and graph neural networks. He is a University Professor of Computer Science at RWTH Aachen University, where he holds the Chair for Logic and Theory of Discrete Systems.

== Life ==
Grohe earned his doctorate (Dr. rer. nat.) at the University of Freiburg in 1994. His dissertation, The Structure of Fixed-Point Logics, was supervised by Heinz-Dieter Ebbinghaus. After postdoctoral research at the University of California, Santa Cruz and Stanford University, he earned his habilitation at the University of Freiburg in 1998. He became professor at the University of Illinois Chicago in 2000, reader at the University of Edinburgh in 2001, and professor at the Humboldt University of Berlin in 2003, before becoming professor at RWTH Aachen University in 2012.

== Books ==
Grohe is the author of Descriptive Complexity, Canonisation, and Definable Graph Structure Theory (Lecture Notes in Logic 47, Cambridge University Press, 2017). In 2011, Grohe and Johann A. Makowsky published as editors the 558th proceedings of the AMS-ASL special session on Model Theoretic Methods in Finite Combinatorics, which was held on January 5-8 2009 in Washington, DC. With Jörg Flum, he is the co-author of Parameterized Complexity Theory (Springer, 2006).

- Grohe, Martin (17 August 2017). Descriptive Complexity, Canonisation, and Definable Graph Structure Theory. Cambridge University Press. doi:10.1017/9781139028868. ISBN 978-1-107-01452-7. S2CID 125568998.
- Grohe, Martin; Makowsky, Johann A. (2011). Model Theoretic Methods in Finite Combinatorics: AMS-ASL Joint Special Session, January 5-8, 2009, Washington, DC. Vol. 558. Washington, DC: American Mathematical Soc. ISBN 978-0-8218-4943-9.
- Flum, Jörg; Grohe, M. (2006). Parameterized complexity theory. Berlin: Springer. ISBN 978-3-540-29953-0. OCLC 262692167.

== Recognition ==
Grohe won the Heinz Maier–Leibnitz Prize awarded by the German Research Foundation in 1999, and he was elected as an ACM Fellow in 2017 for "contributions to logic in computer science, database theory, algorithms, and computational complexity". In 2022, he was awarded an ERC Advanced Grant "Symmetry and Similarity".
