= Vianu =

Vianu (Romanian pronunciation: [viˈanu]) is a Romanian surname:

- Alexandru Vianu
- Ion Vianu
- Elena Vianu
- Maria Alexandrescu Vianu
- Victor Vianu, computer scientist
- Tudor Vianu (1898–1964), literary critic, art critic, poet, philosopher
  - Tudor Vianu National College of Computer Science
