= Spectrum problem =

A spectrum problem arises when considering either of two related concepts in mathematical logic:

- Spectrum of a theory
- Spectrum of a sentence
