= Quantifier rank =

Depth of nesting of quantifiers in a formula

In mathematical logic, the quantifier rank of a formula is the depth of nesting of its quantifiers. It plays an essential role in model theory.

The quantifier rank is a property of the formula itself (i.e. the expression in a language). Thus two logically equivalent formulae can have different quantifier ranks, when they express the same thing in different ways.

== Definition ==
=== In first-order logic ===
Let $\varphi$ be a first-order formula. The quantifier rank of $\varphi$, written $\operatorname{qr}(\varphi)$, is defined as:

- $\operatorname{qr}(\varphi) = 0$, if $\varphi$ is atomic.
- $\operatorname{qr}(\varphi_1 \land \varphi_2) = \operatorname{qr}(\varphi_1 \lor \varphi_2) = \max(\operatorname{qr}(\varphi_1), \operatorname{qr}(\varphi_2))$.
- $\operatorname{qr}(\lnot \varphi) = \operatorname{qr}(\varphi)$.
- $\operatorname{qr}(\exists_x \varphi) = \operatorname{qr}(\varphi) + 1$.
- $\operatorname{qr}(\forall_x \varphi) = \operatorname{qr}(\varphi) + 1$.

Remarks

- We write $\operatorname{FO}[n]$ for the set of all first-order formulas $\varphi$ with $\operatorname{qr}(\varphi) \le n$.
- Relational $\operatorname{FO}[n]$ (without function symbols) is always of finite size, i.e. contains a finite number of formulas.
- In prenex normal form, the quantifier rank of $\varphi$ is exactly the number of quantifiers appearing in $\varphi$.

=== In higher-order logic ===
For fixed-point logic, with a least fixed-point operator $\operatorname{LFP}$: $\operatorname{qr}([\operatorname{LFP}_\phi]y) = 1 + \operatorname{qr}( \phi )$.

== Examples ==
- A sentence of quantifier rank 2:

$$\forall x\exists y R(x, y)$$

- A formula of quantifier rank 1:

$$\forall x R(y, x) \wedge \exists x R(x, y)$$

- A formula of quantifier rank 0:

$$R(x, y) \wedge x \neq y$$

- A sentence in prenex normal form of quantifier rank 3:

$$\forall x \exists y \exists z ((x \neq y \wedge x R y) \wedge (x \neq z \wedge z R x))$$

- A sentence, equivalent to the previous, although of quantifier rank 2:

$$\forall x (\exists y (x \neq y \wedge x R y)) \wedge \exists z (x \neq z \wedge z R x ))$$

== See also ==
- Ehrenfeucht–Fraïssé game
