= Tîrnova, Dondușeni =

Târnova
- Commune
- Location in Moldova
- Coordinates: 48°10′N 27°39′E
- Country: Moldova
- District: Dondușeni District

Population (2014)
  - Total: 3,539
- Time zone: UTC+2 (EET)
  - Summer (DST): UTC+3 (EEST)

Tîrnova is a commune in Dondușeni District, Moldova. It is composed of three villages: Briceva, Elenovca (formerly Elena-Doamnă) and Tîrnova.

Briceva (also Brichevo, Bricheva, Yiddish: בריטשעווע, romanized: Britcheva) was established as a Jewish agricultural colony in 1836 and maintained Jewish majority until World War II.

== People ==
- Gary Bertini (born in Briceva)
- Boris Trakhtenbrot (born in Briceva)
- Mihail Șleahtițchi
