= Tova Milo =

Israeli computer scientist

- טובה מילוא
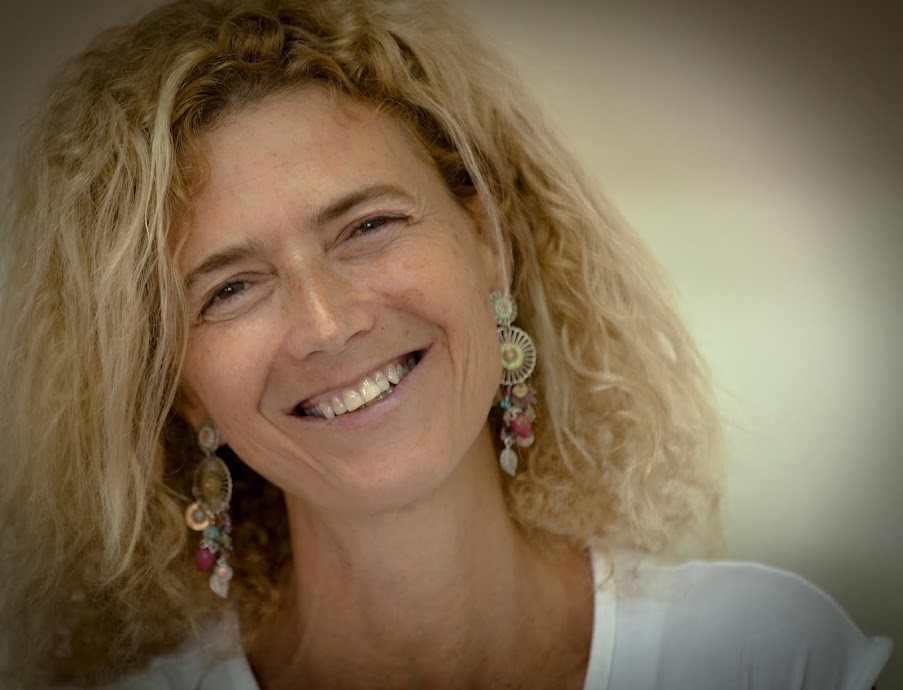
- Milo in 2014
- Education: Hebrew University
- Known for: Models and algorithms for web data, semi-structured data and XML, crowd-based data sourcing
- Awards: The PODS Test-of-Time Award, the Weizmann Award, the VLDB Women in Database Research Award, the IEEE TCDE Impact award and Doctorate Honoris Causa by the University of Zurich
- Scientific career
- Fields: Computer science
- Workplaces: Tel Aviv University
- Doctoral advisor: Catriel Beeri

Tova Milo (Hebrew: טובה מילוא) is a full Professor of Computer Science at Tel Aviv University and the Dean of the Faculty of Exact Sciences. She served as the head of the Computer Science Department from 2011 to 2014. Milo is the head of the data management group in Tel Aviv University, and her research focuses on Web data management. She received her PhD from the Hebrew University in 1992 under the supervision of Catriel Beeri, and was a postdoctoral fellow at the University of Toronto and INRIA, France, prior to joining Tel Aviv University.

== Career ==
Milo has co-authored over 290 papers in top database conferences and journals, as well as a book on business processes, with over 13,000 citations and H-Index 61 (computed by Google Scholar). Milo is one of the most prolific authors in the premier Symposium on Principles of Database Systems and was the first (and only, as of 2015) woman to be a keynote speaker at this symposium. In 2010, Milo and her co-authors Victor Vianu and Dan Suciu won the Alberto O. Mendelzon Test-of-Time Award for their paper on type checking for XML transformation languages.

Milo has served on the editorial board of top database journals (VLDB journal, and TODS) and as the Program Committee Chair of (among others) the Symposium on Principles of Database Systems, the International Conference on Database Theory (ICDT), as well as the VLDB conference. She is a member of the ICDT Council and the VLDB Endowment.

In 2011 Milo has been awarded the ERC Advanced Investigators Grant. In 2012 she was elected as an ACM Fellow for her "contributions to database theory and business process management". In 2014, she was elected a member of the Academia Europaea. In 2017, she won the Weizmann Prize for Exact Sciences as well as the VLDB Women in Database Research award. In 2022, she was awarded the IEEE TCDE Impact award. In 2023, she received Doctorate Honoris Causa by the University of Zurich.

Milo is featured on the Notable Women in Computing cards.
