= Boris Trakhtenbrot =

Russian-Israeli mathematician

- Борис Авраамович Трахтенброт
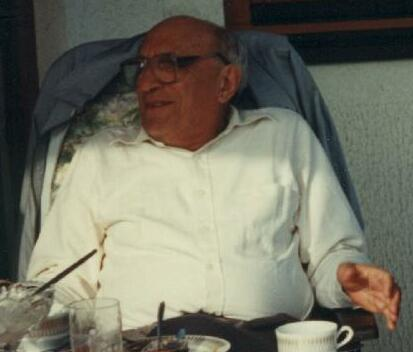
- 1994
- Born: 19 February 1921; Brichevo, Bessarabia
- Died: 19 September 2016 (aged 95); Rehovot, Israel
- Spouse: Berta I. Rabinovich (m. 1947; died 2013)

Academic background
- Education: Ukrainian Academy of Science
- Thesis: Decidability Problems for Finite Classes and Definitions of Finite Sets (1950)
- Doctoral advisor: Pyotr Novikov

Boris (Boaz) Abramovich Trakhtenbrot (Russian: Борис Авраамович Трахтенброт, Hebrew: בועז טרכטנברוט; 19 February 1921 – 19 September 2016) was a Russian-Israeli mathematician in logic, algorithms, theory of computation, and cybernetics.

== Biography ==
Trakhtenbrot was born into a Jewish family in Brichevo, northern Bessarabia (now Tîrnova, Moldova). He studied at the Moldovan State Pedagogical Institute in Kishinev, Chernivtsi University, and the Ukrainian Academy of Science's Mathematical Institute, completing a Ph.D. at the latter institution in 1950.

He worked at Akademgorodok, Novosibirsk during the 1960s and 1970s. In 1964 Trakhtenbrot discovered and proved a fundamental result in theoretical computer science called the gap theorem. He also discovered and proved the theorem in logic, model theory, and computability theory now known as Trakhtenbrot's theorem.

After immigrating to Israel in 1981, he became a professor in the Faculty of Exact Sciences at Tel Aviv University, and continued as professor emeritus until his death. He died on 19 September 2016, at the age of 95.
