= Neil Immerman =

American theoretical computer scientist

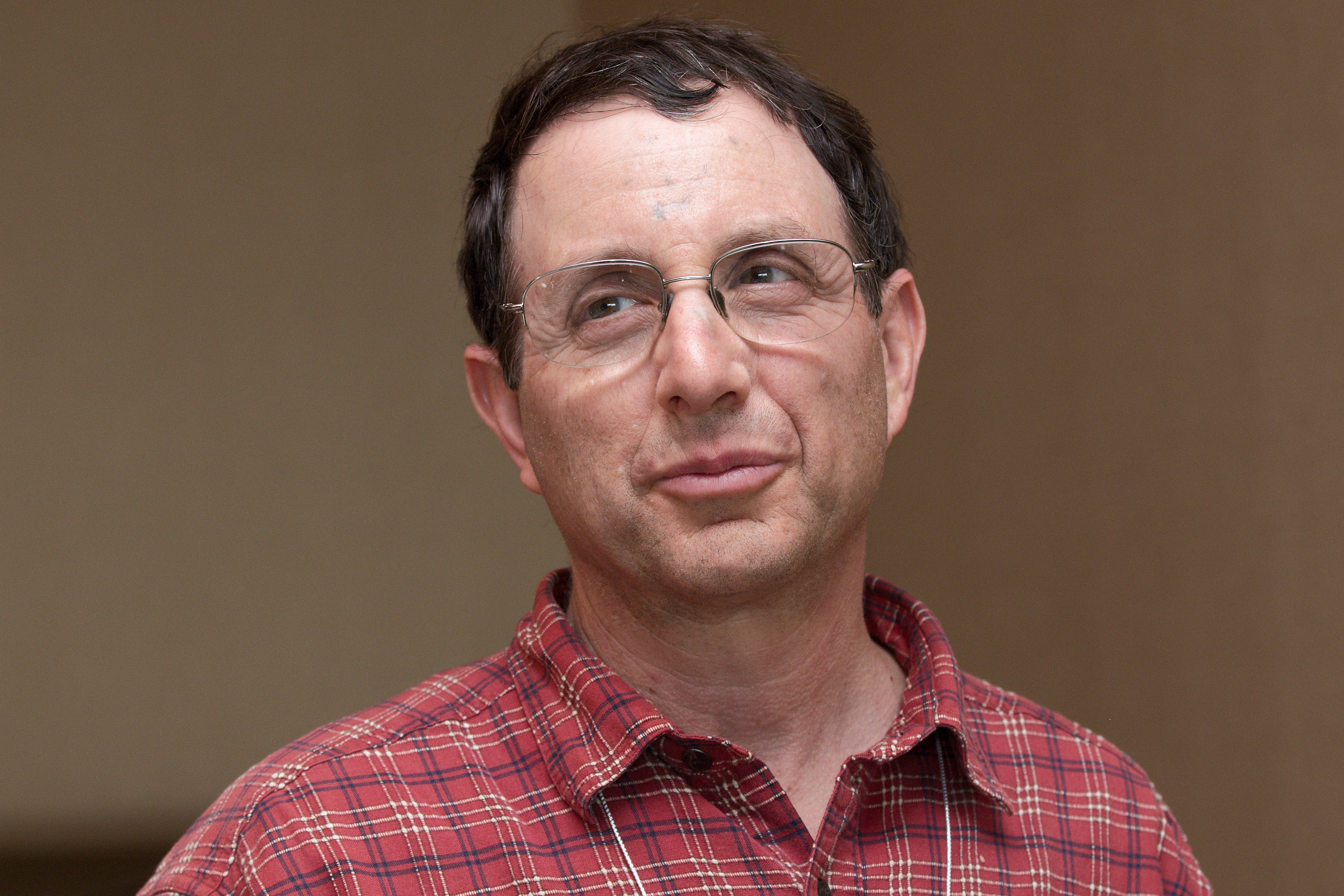
Neil Immerman in 2010.

Neil Immerman (born 24 November 1953, Manhasset, New York) is an American theoretical computer scientist, a professor of computer science at the University of Massachusetts Amherst. He is one of the key developers of descriptive complexity, an approach he is currently applying to research in model checking, database theory, and computational complexity theory.

Professor Immerman is an editor of the SIAM Journal on Computing and of Logical Methods in Computer Science. He received B.S. and M.S. degrees from Yale University in 1974 and his Ph.D. from Cornell University in 1980 under the supervision of Juris Hartmanis, a Turing Award winner at Cornell. His book Descriptive Complexity appeared in 1999.

Immerman is the winner, jointly with Róbert Szelepcsényi, of the 1995 Gödel Prize in theoretical computer science for proof of what is known as the Immerman–Szelepcsényi theorem, the result that nondeterministic space complexity classes are closed under complementation. Immerman is an ACM Fellow and a Guggenheim Fellow.
