= MLIP =

MLIP may refer to:

- MLIP (gene)
- Mackenzie Large Igneous Province, geological area of Canada
- Mili Airport, Marshall Islands, former(?) ICAO code MLIP
- Machine-learned interatomic potential
