= Networked-loan =

Networked-loan, also known as networked-guarantee loan, is a popular economic phenomenon in some Asia countries. In these countries, if the borrowers do not meet the loan criteria of commercial banks, they are allowed to find guarantors to back their applicants. If the borrowers default on their loans, their guarantors take the legal obligation to repay the loan, which is called guaranteed-loan, or networked-guarantee loan. The guarantee interdependencies can be naturally represented as networks, where each node represents a firm, and each directed edge represents the guarantee relationship between the two corresponding firms.

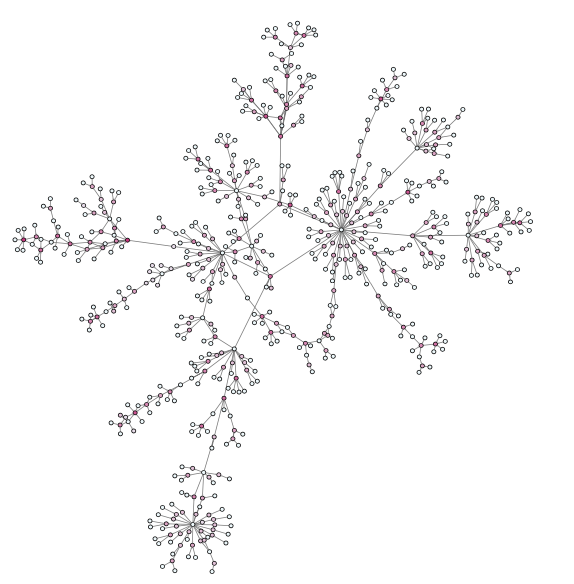
A loan network example.

In practice, there can be more than one guarantor per loan transaction, and there may be multiple loan transactions for a single guarantor in a given period. In addition, enterprises can take on the role of borrowers and guarantors in loan guarantee relationships, or even both. As a result, there are multiple guarantee relationships between firms, including one-way guarantees, mutual guarantees, guarantees chains, and guarantee circles. This gives rise to a complex network of guarantees to obtain greater financing advantages.

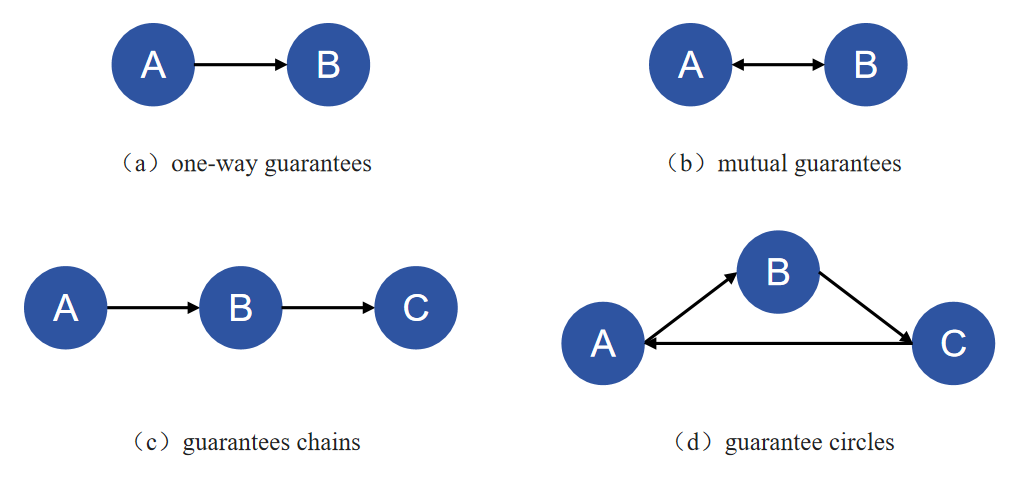
Guarantee relationships between firms.

Once the loan is approved, the company can usually immediately obtain the full amount of the loan and begin to repay the bank via a regular installment plan, until the end of the agreement. Following the establishment of a guarantee relationship, the guarantor and the borrower share information and the borrower 's actions are supervised by the guarantor. This can effectively reduce the transaction costs of credit activities and achieve the optimal allocation of credit resources.

During the credit expansion period, with more and more enterprises involved, they form complex directed networks, which is called guarantee network, or loan network. However, every coin has two sides. On one hand, these secured loans can help an enterprise to source financing rapidly and promote development during a period of economic growth. On the other hand, it may result in a chain risk and even a systematic crisis. Usually, the guaranteed loan has a debt obligation contract. This means if one corporation fails to repay the bank, the guarantor has to pay for it, and this leads to risk spreading across the guarantee network, which may lead to default contagions. To monitor potential risks and prevent large-scale default, the problem of monitoring and rating contagion risk is receiving increasing attention. From such a guarantee network, we can capture the contagion path of obligations and failures. Analyzing guarantee networks using a network science approach, and thus examining the relationship between guarantee network topology and economic policy and contagion risk, helps policymakers identify potential systemic risks arising from corporate failures.

== Background ==
The origin of networked-guarantee loans is as follows. Usually, it's difficult for small and medium businesses to meet the requirements of commercial banks, which are originally designed for large-scale industries. Most of these enterprises in the stage of rapid expansion are difficult to obtain loan funds from the banks. However, they are allowed to seek a guarantee from other businesses in some Asian countries. When more and more enterprises are involved, they form networks with complex structures. In practice, there can be more than one guarantor per loan transaction, and there may be multiple loan transactions for a single guarantor in a given period. Once the loan is approved, the company can usually immediately obtain the full amount of the loan and begin to repay the bank via a regular installment plan, until the end of the agreement.In an economic upturn, guarantee loans can meet the financial needs of unqualified small and medium-sized firms. However, in the economic downturn, default contagion may spread like a virus through the guarantee network, leading to large-scale defaults or even systemic financial crises.

== Procedure ==
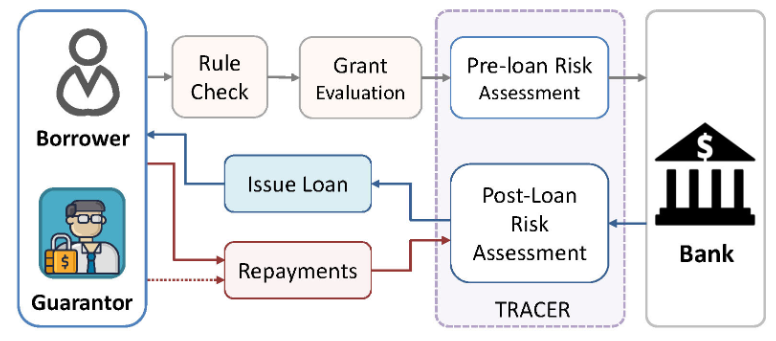
The business procedure of the loan management.

The figure shows a typical procedure for network-guaranteed loans. It includes five modules. First of all, the borrower finds several guarantors to provide credit guarantees and signs the contracts with the banks. Then the banks perform a pre-loan risk assessment, and if passed the borrower receives the funds and repays the interests and principal (or partial) regularly according to the loan contract. The bank monitors the repayment status and conducts a post-loan risk assessment. Suppose the borrower fails to repay the rest part of the loan, its guarantors have to pay as the contract address.

== Contagion in Networked-loans ==
In the financial realm, networked-loan can trigger unforeseeable chain reactions when risks propagate. Each node within the guarantee network, whether a business or an individual, often finds it challenging to survive faced with risks. Due to their interconnectivity, nodes in the network will not only be affected by their own conditions, but also affected by other nodes, consequently affecting additional nodes as well.

Within the financial system, interbank lending via the interbank market creates financial networks that can lead to bankruptcy contagion, thereby sparking financial crises. Negative impacts faced by individual enterprises within business conglomerates can spread across the entire group, causing contagion effects. Furthermore, lending chains formed by commercial credit between upstream and downstream enterprises can result in cascading bankruptcies.

=== Default Contagion ===
Default contagion is usually triggered by accidental defaults that introduce risks in Networked-loans. In the event of a credit default by any of the enterprises in the guarantee network, the risk of default spreads in the direction of propagation along the side of the guarantee relationship to a larger number of associated enterprises in the network. As these are obligatory contracts, default contagion can spread to those who provide the guarantees. Predicting how a debt default might spread is critical to introducing appropriate response interventions. Appropriate guarantee alliances can reduce the risk of default, but significant losses from default contagion can still occur between network companies. When more and more firms are engaged, they form complex networks, and a default may spread across the network along the direction of guarantee relationships (contagion risk) and lead to large-scale loan defaults or even systemic financial crises. In an economic downturn, default events can multiply as large-scale corporate defaults cause side effects in the network. In such cases, the sponsoring network can be estranged from “joint assistance group” as a “breach of contract”. A crisis can trigger a domino effect when some firms face operational difficulties. Defaults can spread rapidly through the network, disadvantaging a large number of firms. It may lead to a systemic crisis.

At this stage, control and mitigation are imperative. Contrary to popular belief, financial crisis enhances the resilience of mutual network while government bailouts degenerate network resilience. After the elimination or eradication phase, the collateral network may need to be broken up into several smaller networks, with some firms going bankrupt, to reduce the transmission risk. However, when the government intervenes during these phases, many bankruptcies would be prevented, thus compromising the resilience of the network.

=== Dishonesty Risk Contagion ===
As a generalized credit risk, dishonesty risk can have significant affects in the guarantee network. If an enterprise has a breach of dishonesty risk, on the one hand, as a guaranteed, it may cause its guarantor to suffer losses within the scope of the guarantee amount; on the other hand, as a guarantor, it may cause the guaranteed to suffer credit losses. Dishonesty risk has a contagion effect in the guarantee network, and the contagion can affect the credit spread of bonds. The untrustworthy behavior of enterprises has produced three types of contagion effects. The first is the direct contagion effect. Whether the guarantor or the guaranteed has acted untrustworthy, it will cause the credit spread of the bond issuer rising. The second is the local contagion effect. If the proportion of untrustworthy entities in the local guarantee network increases, it may cause investors to impose "group penalties" on the bond issuers, leading to an increase in credit spreads. The third is the global diffusion effect, in which untrustworthy information spreads along the guarantee network to the entire market, causing the credit spread of the bond rising.

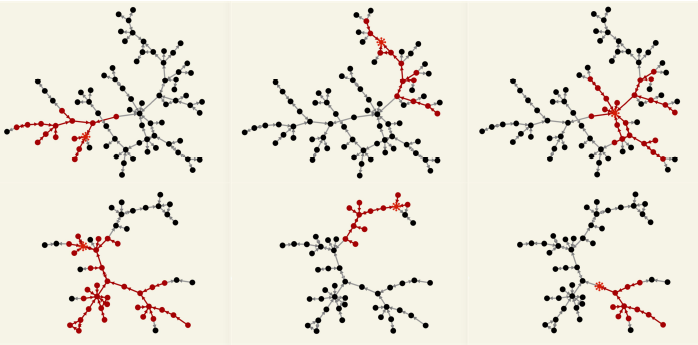
Risk contagion example

== Risk Rating in Networked-loans ==
The guaranteed loan has a debt obligation contract. This means if one corporation fails to repay the bank, the guarantor has to pay for it, and this leads to risk spreading across the guarantee network. In a guarantee network, defaults by individual firms can spread and propagate through the network, leading to systemic financial risk. Therefore, it is crucial to identify the risk of cascading failure in a guarantee network caused by the failure of one or several entities, as such cascading failures can undermine the connectivity and reliability of the entire credit system.

To address these problems, some deep learning-based methods are proposed Usually, the accidental default is tolerable while the large-scale defaults or systemic financial crisis is to be firmly prevented.

The banking industry has developed credit risk models for each loan applicant since the middle of the twentieth century. The risk rating is also the main business of thousands of worldwide corporations, including dozens of public companies. They have kept these models state-of-the-art by investing millions of dollars. However, global loan default losses still amounted to over 50 billion US dollars in 2018 and are forecasted to continue to increase. This massive amount of losses has increased the importance of risk curbing. Traditionally, the credit scoring models are built using regression algorithms with the temporal credit or loan history as well as some aggregated financial information of the applicants. Shallow learning methods, including the classic logistic regression, neural network, etc., are extensively utilized to obtain the credit score of the applicants.

Deep learning methods have been recently used to address this problem. TRACER is a novel approach to rate the risk of contagion chains in the bank industry with the deep neural network. They employed the temporal inter-chain attention network on graph-structured loan behavior data to compute risk scores for the contagion chains, which is significantly better than the state-of-the-art baselines on the dataset from a major financial institution in Asia. CRDAN is a deep learning-based risk assessment method for the contagion path of guarantee networks, which directly learns loan behaviors through a graph neural network feature learning layer to generate higher-order implicit representations, and also develops an attention mechanism model to dynamically learn the effects of neighboring propagation paths in the network. The method is effective in contagion path risk assessment and can provide a methodological and theoretical basis for regulators and financial institutions to conduct systematic risk assessment of collateral networks.

Some visualization tools are also proposed to apply visual analytics for networked-guarantee loans risk management.

=== Top-K Vulnerable Firms in Networked-loans ===
To identify and ultimately prevent systematic crises in guaranteed loan networks, an important approach is to identify the top-k vulnerable nodes(firms) and place them under close supervision. A study in 2022 modeled the problem with an uncertain graph, and infer the default probability of a node following the possible world semantics, which has been widely used to capture the contagious phenomenon in real networks. In particular, it utilize an uncertain graph with two types of probabilities to model the occurrence and prorogation of the default risks in the network, namely the self-risk probability and the diffusion probability. To accelerate the process of searching for the vulnerable nodes, it employed combinations of basic sampling approach, optimized sampling approach and bottom-k based approach. They received the best result in efficiency with the bottom-k based method by integrating reverse while mostly maintaining the precision (Compared with the naive approach). The proposed approach outperforms baseline methods such as GBDT and HGAR as measured by AUC.

== Stemming Contagion Risk in Networked-Loans ==
The networked-loan has become an important issue affecting the stable operation of enterprises and the financial system, and risk contagion has also had a significant negative impact on regional financial stability and economic development. Containing risk contagion in guarantee networks and preventing potential systemic financial crises is therefore critical to the long-term health of inclusive finance and sustainable economic development.

A study used complex network theory to study the risk propagation model of guarantee networks, and found and explained the general pattern of risk propagation, including the calculation of important indicators such as steady-state risk density and risk propagation speed, which provided a way for commercial banks to avoid guarantee risk. In addition, due to the dependence of network risk contagion on the correlation network structure, the guaranteed network risk contagion path is relationally transitive and relies on the guarantee chain for implementation. Hence, System construction and visual supervision of the correlation network structure are very necessary.

On the basis of empirical analysis, a study in 2023 proposes a novel approach called SCRPF to predict critical firms for stemming contagion risk in the bank industry with deep reinforcement learning integrated with high-order graph message-passing networks. It uses the framework of deep reinforcement learning to learn from historical traces and train the policy network to generate critical firm lists. To preserve contagion representations, SCRPF leverages a high-order message passing graph neural network to encode the graph-structured risk diffusion behavior directly on contagion chains, which no longer requires expensive handcraft feature engineering or sophisticated financial knowledge. Then, the DRL agent uses the policy of a trained graph attentional neural network to predict a priority list of critical firms for networked-loans. This work provides a practical solution by identifying critical firms to stem the contagion risk so that to mitigate systemic financial crises through graph-based deep reinforcement learning. Furthermore, iConReg regulates the contagion risk of networked-loans using deep graph learning techniques for detecting and isolating of contagion risk in China's nationalwide networked-loans. It enables the authorities to design more prompt prevention measures against systemic financial crises.
