= Andrey Leman =

Soviet mathematician and computer scientist (1940–2012)

Andrey Andreevich Leman
- Born: 3 October 1940
- Died: 5 November 2012 (aged 72)
- Education: Mathematician and Computer scientist

Andrey Andreevich Leman (Russian: Андрей Андреевич Леман, 03.10.1940–05.11.2012) was a Soviet mathematician and computer scientist who is known for the development of the Weisfeiler Leman graph isomorphism test together with Boris Weisfeiler published in 1968. He contributed to the chess computer Kaissa, which was the winner of the world's first chess tournament between computer programs in 1974. In his youth he successfully participated in math Olympiads (Московская математическая олимпиада) becoming a jury member for the Moscow Mathematical Olympiad in the 1960s. He also coedited a book for preparation of future olympiad participants. He contributed to the first Soviet database INES which was used ubiquitously in the USSR and for which he received the USSR Council of Ministers Prize. In 1990 he emigrated into the US where he continued to work as a software developer. He contributed to the Cuneiform OCR in the 1990s which was used by notable companies such as Oracle, IBM, and Samsung.
