= Theory of Computing =

- Discipline: Theoretical computer science
- Language: English
- Edited by: László Babai

Publication details
- History: 2005-present
- Publisher: Department of Computer Science, University of Chicago
- Open access: Yes
- License: CC BY 3.0

Standard abbreviations
- ISO 4: Theory Comput.

Indexing
- ISSN: 1557-2862
- LCCN: 2005213128
- OCLC no.: 58532799

Links
- Journal homepage; Online archive

Theory of Computing is a peer-reviewed open access scientific journal covering theoretical computer science. The journal was established in 2005 and is published by the Department of Computer Science of the University of Chicago. The editor-in-chief is László Babai (University of Chicago).
