= Boris Weisfeiler =

Russian mathematician (1941-c.1985)

Boris Yulievich Weisfeiler
- Born: April 19, 1941; Moscow, Russian SFSR, Soviet Union
- Disappeared: January 1985; San Fabián de Alico, Chile
- Status: Missing for 41 years, 8 months and 1 day
- Scientific career
- Education: Steklov Institute of Mathematics (Ph.D.)
- Known for: Weisfeiler–Leman algorithm; Weisfeiler filtration; Kac–Weisfeiler conjectures
- Fields: Mathematics
- Workplaces: Pennsylvania State University
- Thesis: Some properties of anisotropic algebraic groups (1970)
- Doctoral advisor: Èrnest Borisovich Vinberg

Boris Weisfeiler (born 19 April 1941 – disappeared 4–5 January 1985) was a Soviet-born mathematician and professor at Penn State University who lived in the United States before disappearing in Chile in 1985. Declassified US documents suggest a Chilean army patrol seized Weisfeiler and took him to Colonia Dignidad, a secretive Germanic agricultural commune set up in Chile in the 1960s. During the Chilean Pinochet military dictatorship Boris Weisfeiler allegedly drowned. He is known for the Weisfeiler filtration, Weisfeiler–Leman algorithm and Kac–Weisfeiler conjectures.

== Early life and career ==
Weisfeiler, a Jew, was born in the Soviet Union. He received his Ph.D. in 1970 from the Steklov Institute of Mathematics Leningrad Department, as a student of Ernest Vinberg. In the early 1970s, Weisfeiler was asked to sign a letter against a colleague, and for his refusal was branded "anti-Soviet". Weisfeiler left the Soviet Union in 1975 to be free to advance his career and practice his religion. After a brief period under Armand Borel at the Institute for Advanced Study, near Princeton University, Weisfeiler became a professor at Pennsylvania State University. In 1981, he was naturalized as an American citizen.

Weisfeiler's research spanned twenty years, and he published three dozen research papers during his lifetime. According to his colleague Alexander Lubotzky, Weisfeiler was studying "the more difficult questions" of algebraic groups in "the case when the field is not algebraically closed and the groups do not split or—even worse—are nonisotropic". He is known for the Weisfeiler–Leman algorithm, the Kac–Weisfeiler conjectures, the Weisfeiler filtration, and work on strong approximation and on finite linear groups.

== Disappearance ==
Weisfeiler, an experienced outdoorsman, flew to Chile at Christmas time of 1984 to hike alone in the Chilean Andes. Chile was then under a military dictatorship headed by General Augusto Pinochet, which committed numerous human rights abuses (before he died in 2006, Pinochet had been prosecuted for his role in Operation Colombo and indicted in absentia in other countries). After the effective end of military rule, in 1990, the Chilean government took steps to investigate additional activities under the Pinochet regime.

According to Chilean governmental reports, Weisfeiler was hiking near the border of the Colonia Dignidad at the time of his disappearance. Conflicting reports make the details of the disappearance impossible to discern. The Chilean government has ruled that Weisfeiler had entered the confluence of two swift-moving rivers and drowned, his body never to be recovered. Local fishermen say they camped with Boris and gave him directions northward, toward a bridge near the Colonia. Some people claim to have seen his footprints near the river and to have found his backpack and other items (the items may have been sold or destroyed by the Chilean government in the late 1990s, as evidenced by Chilean governmental documents and published news articles).

Although no conclusive proof connects Weisfeiler's disappearance to any entity, some American and Chilean officials do suspect one particular group. Unknown to most of the world, Colonia Dignidad sat on a large tract of land not far from the border with Argentina. Idyllic in appearance, the Colonia was run by German expatriates led by cult leader Paul Schäfer, and acted as a torture and killing center for the Pinochet regime. The BBC has reported and Chilean governmental documents suggest that the Chilean Dirección de Inteligencia Nacional (the secret police, which was disbanded in 1977) brought suspected anti-government prisoners there to be interrogated.

According to United States Department of State reports, other witnesses claim they saw Boris Weisfeiler in the Colonia several years after his disappearance. At least one claims he was alive some three years later; another claims he was assassinated as a Soviet or Jewish spy. Weisfeiler's whereabouts remain unknown, and his sister Olga, who, like her brother, emigrated to the United States, continues to petition numerous authorities to determine his fate. Early in 2006, a bipartisan Congressional letter signed by 27 senators and representatives was delivered to Chilean President Michelle Bachelet in the hope of speeding an official Chilean investigation into his fate.

On August 21, 2012, a Chilean judge ordered the arrest of eight retired police and military officers in connection with the alleged kidnapping and disappearance of Boris Weisfeiler. According to the court filings, the suspects were to have been prosecuted for "aggravated kidnapping" and "complicity" in the disappearance of a U.S. citizen between January 3–5, 1985; the filings did not mention where Weisfeiler might have been taken after his detention or what may have happened to him afterwards. The case was closed in 2016, after the judge ruled the disappearance to be a common crime (for which the statute of limitations had passed), not a violation of human rights.

== In other media and popular culture ==
- A short film, The Colony, based on Weisfeiler's disappearance and directed by Steven List, was released in 2007.
- A documentary by TVN Chile: El misterio Boris Weisfeiler | Enigma - T3E8, was released in 2003.

== Works ==
- Weisfeiler, Boris (1976). On Construction and Identification of Graphs. Berlin, Heidelberg: Springer. ISBN 978-3-540-37539-5.

== See also ==
- List of people who disappeared mysteriously: post-1970
- Charles Horman
- Frank Teruggi
