= Muscular LMNA-interacting protein =

Protein-coding gene in the species Homo sapiens

An Error has occurred retrieving Wikidata item for infobox Muscular LMNA interacting protein (MLIP) is a protein that in humans is encoded by the MLIP gene.

== Function ==
The function of MLIP is not known but it has been suggested that it may have a role in the growth of the heart and heart disease. There is some evidence that MLIP may be involved in maintaining cardiac homeostasis and in the initial reaction to changes in workload. However, a knockout mouse model had normal cardiac function and no structural abnormalities, showing that MLIP is not vital to these processes.

== Gene ==
=== Aliases ===
Muscular LMNA interacting protein has a number of aliases including MLIP, C6orf142, CIP and Muscle-enriched A-type Lamin-interacting Protein.

=== Locus and size ===
MLIP is located on the short arm of chromosome 6 in humans with the exact locus of 6p12.1. The gene spans 53929982 to 54266280 on the + strand of chromosome 6. It has 19 exons and 13 splice variants ranging in size from 23 to 57 kDa.

=== Orthologs and homologs ===
MLIP is found only in amniotes (reptiles, birds and mammals), where it is highly conserved. The mouse homologue is 2310046A06rik.

== Expression and interactions ==
MLIP is expressed throughout the body with higher levels found in the heart and muscle cells. It interacts with the nuclear envelope proteins lamin A/C, which is what led to its discovery. It also interacts with Islet1 transcription factor.
