= Machine-learned interatomic potential =

Interatomic potentials constructed by machine learning programs

Machine-learned interatomic potentials (MLIPs), or simply machine learning potentials (MLPs), are interatomic potentials constructed using machine learning. Beginning in the 1990s, researchers have employed such programs to construct interatomic potentials by mapping atomic structures to their potential energies. These potentials are referred to as MLIPs or MLPs.

Such machine learning potentials promised to fill the gap between density functional theory, a highly accurate but computationally intensive modelling method, and empirically derived or intuitively-approximated potentials, which were far lighter computationally but substantially less accurate. Improvements in artificial intelligence technology heightened the accuracy of MLPs while lowering their computational cost, increasing the role of machine learning in fitting potentials.

Machine learning potentials began by using neural networks to tackle low-dimensional systems. While promising, these models could not systematically account for interatomic energy interactions; they could be applied to small molecules in a vacuum, or molecules interacting with frozen surfaces, but not much else – and even in these applications, the models often relied on force fields or potentials derived empirically or with simulations. These models thus remained confined to academia.

Modern neural networks construct highly accurate and computationally light potentials, as theoretical understanding of materials science was increasingly built into their architectures and preprocessing. Almost all are local, accounting for all interactions between an atom and its neighbor up to some cutoff radius. There exist some nonlocal models, but these have been experimental for almost a decade. For most systems, reasonable cutoff radii enable highly accurate results.

Almost all neural networks intake atomic coordinates and output potential energies. For some, these atomic coordinates are converted into atom-centered symmetry functions. From this data, a separate atomic neural network is trained for each element; each atomic network is evaluated whenever that element occurs in the given structure, and then the results are pooled together at the end. This process – in particular, the atom-centered symmetry functions which convey translational, rotational, and permutational invariances – has greatly improved machine learning potentials by significantly constraining the neural network search space. Other models use a similar process but emphasize bonds over atoms, using pair symmetry functions and training one network per atom pair.

Other models to learn their own descriptors rather than using predetermined symmetry-dictating functions. These models, called message-passing neural networks (MPNNs), are graph neural networks. Treating molecules as three-dimensional graphs (where atoms are nodes and bonds are edges), the model takes feature vectors describing the atoms as input, and iteratively updates these vectors as information about neighboring atoms is processed through message functions and convolutions. These feature vectors are then used to predict the final potentials. The flexibility of this method often results in stronger, more generalizable models. In 2017, the first-ever MPNN model (a deep tensor neural network) was used to calculate the properties of small organic molecules.

== Gaussian approximation potential ==
One popular class of machine-learned interatomic potential is the Gaussian approximation potential (GAP), which combines compact descriptors of local atomic environments with Gaussian process regression to machine learn the potential energy surface of a given system. To date, the GAP framework has been used to successfully develop a number of MLIPs for various systems, including for elemental systems such as carbon, silicon, phosphorus, and tungsten, as well as for multicomponent systems such as Ge_{2}Sb_{2}Te_{5} and austenitic stainless steel, Fe_{7}Cr_{2}Ni.

== Equivariant graph neural networks ==
A significant limitation of early MPNNs was that they were not inherently equivariant to rotations and reflections of atomic structures — meaning predictions could change depending on how a molecule was oriented in space. Beginning around 2021, a new class of models addressed this by incorporating equivariance directly into the message-passing layers using spherical harmonics and irreducible representations. Notable examples include NequIP (2021), MACE (2022), and GemNet-OC (2022). These equivariant architectures proved substantially more data-efficient and accurate than their predecessors, and became the dominant paradigm for high-accuracy MLIPs.

== Foundation models, universal MLIPs and large-scale datasets ==
Early MLIPs were system-specific, trained on a few thousand structures of a single material. This meant that to develop a potential for a new material, a new, comparatively large training dataset had to be developed and a model trained from scratch. A major shift occurred with the creation of large, chemically diverse datasets enabling models that generalize across many elements, bonding environments, and application domains — so-called universal MLIPs or foundation models. Examples of such models include M3GNet, CHGNet, and potentials based on the MACE and GRACE architectures.

A key driver was the Open Catalyst Project (OC20, OC22), a collaboration between Meta AI (FAIR) and Carnegie Mellon University launched in 2020. OC20 comprises approximately 1.3 million DFT relaxations across 82 elements, designed to accelerate the discovery of catalysts for renewable energy applications. It was among the first datasets large enough to train GNNs that generalize across diverse chemical systems, and established a widely-used benchmark for the field. A subsequent dataset, Open Direct Air Capture (OpenDAC 2023 and OpenDAC 2025), applied the same approach to carbon capture, providing a large computational database of metal-organic frameworks and sorbent candidates evaluated for CO₂ capture, generated using nearly 400 million CPU hours of quantum chemistry calculations in collaboration with Georgia Tech.

These datasets revealed a new challenge: the GNN architectures most effective for atomic simulations were memory-intensive, as they model higher-order interactions between triplets or quadruplets of atoms, making it difficult to scale model size. Graph Parallelism, introduced by Sriram et al. (ICLR 2022), addressed this by distributing a single input graph across multiple GPUs — a distinct strategy from data parallelism (which distributes training examples) or model parallelism (which distributes layers). This enabled training GNNs with hundreds of millions to billions of parameters for the first time.

Building on these foundations, Meta FAIR released the Universal Model for Atoms (UMA) in 2025, trained on approximately 500 million unique 3D atomic structures spanning molecules, materials, and catalysts — the largest training run to date for an MLIP. UMA introduced a Mixture of Linear Experts (MoLE) architecture, enabling one model to learn from datasets generated by different DFT codes and settings without significant inference overhead. It matches or surpasses specialized models across catalysis, materials, and molecular benchmarks without task-specific fine-tuning, and has been described as marking a "pre/post-UMA" divide in the field.

== Applications ==
Catalyst discovery: MLIPs have significantly accelerated the computational screening of heterogeneous catalysts by replacing expensive DFT relaxations with fast neural network surrogates. The Open Catalyst Project explicitly targets this application, aiming to identify new catalysts for green hydrogen production and other renewable energy reactions.

Carbon capture: The OpenDAC project applies universal MLIPs to screening sorbent materials for direct air capture of CO₂, a key technology for climate change mitigation. AI-accelerated screening allows evaluation of orders of magnitude more candidate materials than traditional DFT workflows.

Drug discovery and molecular design: MLIPs are increasingly used in pharmaceutical research to model molecular conformations and binding energies. The Open Molecules 2025 (OMol25) dataset, released by Meta FAIR in 2025, provides high-accuracy calculations for a large set of molecular systems to support this use case.

Materials discovery: Universal MLIPs enable high-throughput screening of novel inorganic materials, including battery electrolytes, semiconductors, and superconductors, by rapidly estimating stability and properties across large chemical spaces.
