= László Babai =

Hungarian-American mathematician and computer scientist

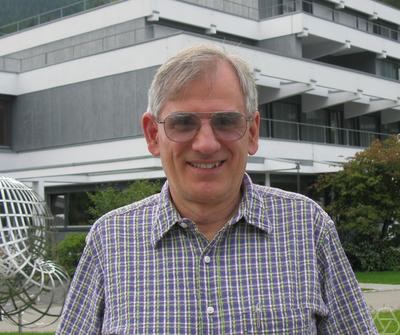
- Babai at Oberwolfach in 2011
- Born: July 20, 1950 (age 76); Budapest, Hungary
- Citizenship: Hungary; United States
- Education: Hungarian Academy of Sciences
- Awards: Gödel Prize (1993); Knuth Prize (2015); Dijkstra Prize (2016)
- Scientific career
- Fields: Computer Science, Mathematics
- Workplaces: University of Chicago
- Doctoral advisor: Pál Turán; Vera T. Sós
- Doctoral students: Mario Szegedy; Gábor Tardos; Péter Pál Pálfy; Barry Guiduli

László "Laci" Babai (born July 20, 1950, in Budapest) is a Hungarian-American professor of computer science and mathematics at the University of Chicago. His research focuses on computational complexity theory, algorithms, combinatorics, and finite groups, with an emphasis on the interactions between these fields.

== Life ==
In 1968, Babai won a gold medal at the International Mathematical Olympiad. Babai studied mathematics at Faculty of Science of the Eötvös Loránd University from 1968 to 1973, received a PhD from the Hungarian Academy of Sciences in 1975, and received a DSc from the Hungarian Academy of Sciences in 1984. He held a teaching position at Eötvös Loránd University since 1971; in 1987 he took joint positions as a professor in algebra at Eötvös Loránd and in computer science at the University of Chicago. In 1995, he began a joint appointment in the mathematics department at Chicago and gave up his position at Eötvös Loránd.

== Work ==
He is the author of over 180 academic papers. His notable accomplishments include the introduction of interactive proof systems, the introduction of the term Las Vegas algorithm, and the introduction of group theoretic methods in graph isomorphism testing. In November 2015, he announced a quasipolynomial time algorithm for the graph isomorphism problem.

He is editor-in-chief of the refereed online journal Theory of Computing. Babai was also involved in the creation of the Budapest Semesters in Mathematics program and coined the name.

=== Graph isomorphism in quasipolynomial time ===
After announcing the result in 2015, Babai presented a paper proving that the graph isomorphism problem can be solved in quasi-polynomial time in 2016, at the ACM Symposium on Theory of Computing. In response to an error discovered by Harald Helfgott, he posted an update in 2017.

abstract

We show that the Graph Isomorphism (GI) problem and the related problems of String Isomorphism (under group action) (SI) and Coset Intersection (CI) can be solved in quasipolynomial $\exp \left( \left( \log n \right)^{O \left( 1 \right)} \right)$ time. The best previous bound for GI was $\exp \left( O \left( \sqrt {n\log n} \right) \right),$ where $n$ is the number of vertices (Luks, 1983); for the other two problems, the bound was similar, $\quad \qquad \exp \left( \tilde O \left( \sqrt n \right) \right),$ where $n$ is the size of the permutation domain (Babai, 1983).
The algorithm builds on Luks's SI framework and attacks the barrier configurations for Luks's algorithm by group theoretic «local certificates» and combinatorial canonical partitioning techniques. We show that in a well-defined sense, Johnson graphs are the only obstructions to effective canonical partitioning.

== Honors ==
In 1988, Babai won the Hungarian State Prize, in 1990 he was elected as a corresponding member of the Hungarian Academy of Sciences, and in 1994 he became a full member. In 1999 the Budapest University of Technology and Economics awarded him an honorary doctorate.

In 1993, Babai was awarded the Gödel Prize together with Shafi Goldwasser, Silvio Micali, Shlomo Moran, and Charles Rackoff, for their papers on interactive proof systems.

In 2005, he received the Quantrell Award.

In 2015, he was elected a fellow of the American Academy of Arts and Sciences, and won the Knuth Prize.

Babai was an invited speaker at the International Congresses of Mathematicians in Kyoto (1990), Zürich (1994, plenary talk), and Rio de Janeiro (2018).

== Sources ==
- Professor László Babai's algorithm is next big step in conquering isomorphism in graphs // Published on Nov 20, 2015 Division of the Physical Sciences / The University of Chicago
- Mathematician claims breakthrough in complexity theory, by Adrian Cho 10 November 2015 17:45 // Posted in Math, Science AAAS News
- A Quasipolynomial Time Algorithm for Graph Isomorphism: The Details + Background on Graph Isomorphism + The Main Result // Math ∩ Programming. Posted on November 12, 2015, by j2kun
- A Little More on the Graph Isomorphism Algorithm // November 21, 2015, by RJLipton+KWRegan (Ken Regan and Dick Lipton)

copy from Lenta.ru // texnomaniya.ru, 20 ноября 2015

- Опубликован быстрый алгоритм для задачи изоморфизма графов // Анатолий Ализар, Хабрахабр, 16 декабря в 02:12

Опубліковано швидкий алгоритм для задачі ізоморфізму графів // Джерело: Хабрахабр, перекладено 16 грудня 2015, 06:30
