= Graph isomorphism =

Bijection between the vertex set of two graphs

In graph theory, an isomorphism of graphs G and H is a bijection between the vertex sets of G and H

$$f \colon V(G) \to V(H)$$

such that any two vertices u and v of G are adjacent in G if and only if $f(u)$ and $f(v)$ are adjacent in H. This kind of bijection is commonly described as "edge-preserving bijection", in accordance with the general notion of isomorphism being a structure-preserving bijection.

If an isomorphism exists between two graphs, then the graphs are called isomorphic, often denoted by $G\simeq H$. In the case when the isomorphism is a mapping of a graph onto itself, i.e., when G and H are one and the same graph, the isomorphism is called an automorphism of G.

Graph isomorphism is an equivalence relation on graphs and as such it partitions the class of all graphs into equivalence classes. A set of graphs isomorphic to each other is called an isomorphism class of graphs. The question of whether graph isomorphism can be determined in polynomial time is a major unsolved problem in computer science, known as the graph isomorphism problem.

The two graphs shown below are isomorphic, despite their different looking drawings.

Graph G	Graph H	An isomorphism between G and H
		f(a) = 1 f(b) = 6 f(c) = 8 f(d) = 3 f(g) = 5 f(h) = 2 f(i) = 4 f(j) = 7

== Variations ==
In the above definition, graphs are understood to be undirected non-labeled non-weighted graphs. However, the notion of isomorphism may be applied to all other variants of the notion of graph, by adding the requirements to preserve the corresponding additional elements of structure: arc directions, edge weights, etc., with the following exception.

=== Isomorphism of labeled graphs ===
For labeled graphs, two definitions of isomorphism are in use.

Under one definition, an isomorphism is a vertex bijection which is both edge-preserving and label-preserving.

Under another definition, an isomorphism is an edge-preserving vertex bijection which preserves equivalence classes of labels, i.e., vertices with equivalent (e.g., the same) labels are mapped onto the vertices with equivalent labels and vice versa; same with edge labels.

For example, the $K_2$ graph with the two vertices labelled with 1 and 2 has a single automorphism under the first definition, but under the second definition there are two auto-morphisms.

The second definition is assumed in certain situations when graphs are endowed with unique labels commonly taken from the integer range 1,...,n, where n is the number of the vertices of the graph, used only to uniquely identify the vertices. In such cases two labeled graphs are sometimes said to be isomorphic if the corresponding underlying unlabeled graphs are isomorphic (otherwise the definition of isomorphism would be trivial).

== Motivation ==
The formal notion of "isomorphism", e.g., of "graph isomorphism", captures the informal notion that some objects have "the same structure" if one ignores individual distinctions of "atomic" components of objects in question. Whenever individuality of "atomic" components (vertices and edges, for graphs) is important for correct representation of whatever is modeled by graphs, the model is refined by imposing additional restrictions on the structure, and other mathematical objects are used: digraphs, labeled graphs, colored graphs, rooted trees and so on. The isomorphism relation may also be defined for all these generalizations of graphs: the isomorphism bijection must preserve the elements of structure which define the object type in question: arcs, labels, vertex/edge colors, the root of the rooted tree, etc.

The notion of "graph isomorphism" allows us to distinguish graph properties inherent to the structures of graphs themselves from properties associated with graph representations: graph drawings, data structures for graphs, graph labelings, etc. For example, if a graph has exactly one cycle, then all graphs in its isomorphism class also have exactly one cycle. On the other hand, in the common case when the vertices of a graph are (represented by) the integers 1, 2,... N, then the expression

$$\sum_{v \in V(G)} v\cdot\text{deg }v$$

may be different for two isomorphic graphs.

== Whitney theorem ==
The exception to Whitney's theorem: these two graphs are not isomorphic but have isomorphic line graphs.

The Whitney graph isomorphism theorem, shown by Hassler Whitney, states that two connected graphs are isomorphic if and only if their line graphs are isomorphic, with a single exception: K_{3}, the complete graph on three vertices, and the complete bipartite graph K_{1,3}, which are not isomorphic but both have K_{3} as their line graph. The Whitney graph theorem can be extended to hypergraphs.

== Recognition of graph isomorphism ==
While graph isomorphism may be studied in a classical mathematical way, as exemplified by the Whitney theorem, it is recognized that it is a problem to be tackled with an algorithmic approach. The computational problem of determining whether two finite graphs are isomorphic is called the graph isomorphism problem.

Its practical applications include primarily cheminformatics, mathematical chemistry (identification of chemical compounds), and electronic design automation (verification of equivalence of various representations of the design of an electronic circuit).

The graph isomorphism problem is one of few standard problems in computational complexity theory belonging to NP, but not known to belong to either of its well-known (and, if P ≠ NP, disjoint) subsets: P and NP-complete. It is one of only two, out of 12 total, problems listed in Garey & Johnson (1979) whose complexity remains unresolved, the other being integer factorization. It is however known that if the problem is NP-complete then the polynomial hierarchy collapses to a finite level.

In November 2015, László Babai, a mathematician and computer scientist at the University of Chicago, claimed to have proven that the graph isomorphism problem is solvable in quasi-polynomial time. He published preliminary versions of these results in the proceedings of the 2016 Symposium on Theory of Computing, and of the 2018 International Congress of Mathematicians. In January 2017, Babai briefly retracted the quasi-polynomiality claim and stated a sub-exponential time complexity bound instead. He restored the original claim five days later. As of 2024, the full journal version of Babai's paper has not yet been published.

Its generalization, the subgraph isomorphism problem, is known to be NP-complete.

The main areas of research for the problem are design of fast algorithms and theoretical investigations of its computational complexity, both for the general problem and for special classes of graphs.

The Weisfeiler Leman graph isomorphism test can be used to heuristically test for graph isomorphism. If the test fails the two input graphs are guaranteed to be non-isomorphic. If the test succeeds the graphs may or may not be isomorphic. There are generalizations of the test algorithm that are guaranteed to detect isomorphisms, however their run time is exponential.

Another well-known algorithm for graph isomorphism is the vf2 algorithm, developed by Cordella et al. in 2001. The vf2 algorithm is a depth-first search algorithm that tries to build an isomorphism between two graphs incrementally. It uses a set of feasibility rules to prune the search space, allowing it to efficiently handle graphs with thousands of nodes. The vf2 algorithm has been widely used in various applications, such as pattern recognition, computer vision, and bioinformatics. While it has a worst-case exponential time complexity, it performs well in practice for many types of graphs.

== See also ==
- Graph homomorphism
- Graph automorphism
- Graph isomorphism problem
- Graph canonization
- Fractional graph isomorphism
