= NNS =

NNS can stand for:

- New neoclassical synthesis (economics)
- NASCAR Nationwide Series (previous name of the NASCAR Xfinity Series)
- Nashville Number System (music)
- National Numeracy Strategy (UK education)
- Near Net Shape
- Nearest neighbor search
- Nearly-new sale
- Newport News Shipbuilding, a shipyard
- Nigerian Navy Ship (NNS)
- Nippon Television Network System
- Non-Nutritive Sweetener, i.e. a Sugar substitute
