= List of unsolved problems in computer science =

List of unsolved computational problems

This article is a list of notable unsolved problems in computer science. A problem in computer science is considered unsolved when no solution is known or when experts in the field disagree about proposed solutions.

== Computational complexity ==
- P versus NP problem – The P vs NP problem is a major unsolved question in computer science that asks whether every problem whose solution can be quickly verified by a computer (NP) can also be quickly solved by a computer (P). This question has profound implications for fields such as cryptography, algorithm design, and computational theory.
- What is the relationship between BQP and NP?
- NC = P problem
- NP = co-NP problem
- P = BPP problem
- P = PSPACE problem
- L = NL problem
- PH = PSPACE problem
- L = P problem
- L = RL problem
- Unique games conjecture
- Is the exponential time hypothesis true?
  - Is the strong exponential time hypothesis (SETH) true?
- Do one-way functions exist?
  - Is public-key cryptography possible?
- Log-rank conjecture
- Hartmanis–Stearns conjecture

== Polynomial versus nondeterministic-polynomial time for specific algorithmic problems ==
- Can integer factorization be done in polynomial time on a classical (non-quantum) computer?
- Can the discrete logarithm be computed in polynomial time on a classical (non-quantum) computer?
- Can the shortest vector of a lattice be computed in polynomial time on a classical or quantum computer?
- Can the graph isomorphism problem be solved in polynomial time on a classical computer?

The graph isomorphism problem involves determining whether two finite graphs are isomorphic, meaning there is a one-to-one correspondence between their vertices and edges that preserves adjacency. While the problem is known to be in NP, it is not known whether it is NP-complete or solvable in polynomial time. This uncertainty places it in a unique complexity class, making it a significant open problem in computer science.

- Is graph canonization polynomial-time equivalent to the graph isomorphism problem?
- Can leaf powers and k-leaf powers be recognized in polynomial time?
- Can parity games be solved in polynomial time?
- Can graphs of bounded clique-width be recognized in polynomial time?
- Can one find a simple closed quasigeodesic on a convex polyhedron in polynomial time?
- Can a simultaneous embedding with fixed edges for two given graphs be found in polynomial time?
- Can the square-root sum problem be solved in polynomial time in the Turing machine model?

== Algorithmic number theory ==
- Skolem problem: Is it decidable whether an algebraic linear recurrence sequence has a zero?
- Hilbert's tenth problem over the field of rational numbers

== Other algorithmic problems ==
- The dynamic optimality conjecture: Do splay trees have a bounded competitive ratio?
- Can a depth-first search tree be constructed in NC?
- Can the fast Fourier transform be computed in o(n log n) time?
- What is the fastest algorithm for multiplication of two n-digit numbers?
- What is the lowest possible average-case time complexity of Shellsort with a deterministic fixed gap sequence?
- Can 3SUM be solved in strongly sub-quadratic time, that is, in time O(n^{2−ϵ}) for some ϵ > 0?
- Can the edit distance between two strings of length n be computed in strongly sub-quadratic time? (This is only possible if the strong exponential time hypothesis is false.)
- Can X + Y sorting be done in o(n^{2} log n) time?
- What is the fastest algorithm for matrix multiplication?
- Can all-pairs shortest paths be computed in strongly sub-cubic time, that is, in time O(V^{3−ϵ}) for some ϵ > 0?
- Can the Schwartz–Zippel lemma for polynomial identity testing be derandomized?
- Does linear programming admit a strongly-polynomial time algorithm? (This is problem #9 in Smale's list of problems.)
- How many queries are required for envy-free cake-cutting?
- What is the algorithmic complexity of the minimum spanning tree problem? Equivalently, what is the decision tree complexity of the MST problem? The optimal algorithm to compute MSTs is known, but it relies on decision trees, so its complexity is unknown.
- Gilbert–Pollak conjecture: Is the Steiner ratio of the Euclidean plane equal to $2/\sqrt{3}$?

== Programming language theory ==
- Barendregt–Geuvers–Klop conjecture: Is every weakly normalizing pure type system also strongly normalizing?

== Other problems ==
- Is multiplicative-exponential linear logic decidable?
- Is the Aanderaa–Karp–Rosenberg conjecture true?
- Černý conjecture: If a deterministic finite automaton with $n$ states has a synchronizing word, must it have one of length at most $(n - 1)^2$?
- Generalized star-height problem: Can all regular languages be expressed using generalized regular expressions with a limited nesting depth of Kleene stars?
- Separating words problem: How many states are needed in a deterministic finite automaton that behaves differently on two given strings of length $n$?
- What is the Turing completeness status of all unique elementary cellular automata?
- Determine whether the length of the minimal uncompletable word of $M$ is polynomial in $l(M)$, or even in $sl(M)$. It is known that $M$ is a variable-length code if for all $u_1,...,u_n,v_1,...,v_m \in M$, $u_1...u_n = v_1...v_m$ implies $n = m$ and $u_i = v_i$ for all $0 < i \leq n$. In such cases, we do not yet know if a polynomial bound exists. This is a possible weakening of the Restivo conjecture (already disproven in general, though upper bounds remain unknown).
- Determine all positive integers $n$ such that the concatenation of $n$ and $n^2$ in base $b$ uses at most $k$ distinct characters, for fixed $b$ and $k$.

== See also ==
- List of unsolved problems in physics
- List of unsolved problems in mathematics
