= Martin Fürer =

Martin Fürer is a Swiss Computer Scientist and a professor of Computer Science at Pennsylvania State University. He is mostly known for his work on fast integer multiplication.

== Research and career ==
One of Fürer's notable results is his fast integer multiplication algorithm STOC presented in 2007 and published in 2009 (Fürer (2009)). His main research is on Graph Theory Algorithms, Approximation Algorithms, Fixed Parameter Tractable Algorithm, and Computational Complexity.

He obtained his PhD in Mathematics from ETH Zurich in 1978 under supervision of Ernst P. Specker and has been a faculty member at Pennsylvania State University since 1987. He is on the editorial board of Journal of Graph Algorithms and Applications and Information and Computation.

== Selected publications ==
- Fürer, Martin (2009), "Faster Integer Multiplication", SIAM Journal on Computing, vol. 39, Society for Industrial and Applied Mathematics (SIAM), pp. 979–1005, doi:10.1137/070711761
