= Principal root of unity =

In mathematics, a principal n-th root of unity (where n is a positive integer) of a ring is an element $\alpha$ satisfying the equations

$$\begin{align}
& \alpha^n = 1 \\
& \sum_{j=0}^{n-1} \alpha^{jk} = 0 \text{ for } 1 \leq k < n
\end{align}$$

In an integral domain, every primitive n-th root of unity is also a principal $n$-th root of unity. In any ring, if n is a power of 2, then any n/2-th root of −1 is a principal n-th root of unity.

A non-example is $3$ in the ring of integers modulo $26$; while $3^3 \equiv 1 \pmod{26}$ and thus $3$ is a cube root of unity, $1 + 3 + 3^2 \equiv 13 \pmod{26}$ meaning that it is not a principal cube root of unity.

The significance of a root of unity being principal is that it is a necessary condition for the theory of the discrete Fourier transform to work out correctly.
