= Number bond =

In mathematics education at primary school level, a number bond (sometimes alternatively called an addition fact) is a simple addition sum which has become so familiar that a child can recognise it and complete it almost instantly, with recall as automatic as that of an entry from a multiplication table in multiplication.

For example, a number bond looks like

$$5 + 2 = 7$$

A child who "knows" this number bond should be able to immediately fill in any one of these three numbers if it were missing, given the other two, without having to "work it out".

Number bonds are often learned in sets for which the sum is a common round number such as 10 or 20. Having acquired some familiar number bonds, children should also soon learn how to use them to develop strategies to complete more complicated sums, for example by navigating from a new sum to an adjacent number bond they know, i.e. 5 + 2 and 4 + 3 are both number bonds that make 7; or by strategies like "making ten", for example recognising that 7 + 6 = (7 + 3) + 3 = 13.

The term "number bond" is also used to refer to a pictorial representation of part-part-whole relationships, often found in the Singapore mathematics curriculum. Number bonds consist of a minimum of 3 circles that are connected by lines. The “whole” is written in the first circle and its “parts” are written in the adjoining circles. Number bonds are used to build deeper understanding of math facts.

== History ==
The term "number bond" is sometimes derided as a piece of unnecessary new mathematical jargon, adding an element of pointless abstraction or incomprehensibility for those not familiar with it (such as children's parents) to a subject even as simple as primary school addition. The term has been used at least since the 1920s and formally entered the primary curriculum in Singapore in the early 1970s.

In the U.K. the phrase came into widespread classroom use from the late 1990s when the National Numeracy Strategy brought in an emphasis on in-classroom discussion of strategies for developing mental arithmetic in its "numeracy hour".

== See also ==
- Addition § Childhood learning and Addition § Decimal system
