= Andrei Toom =

Russian mathematician (1942–2022)

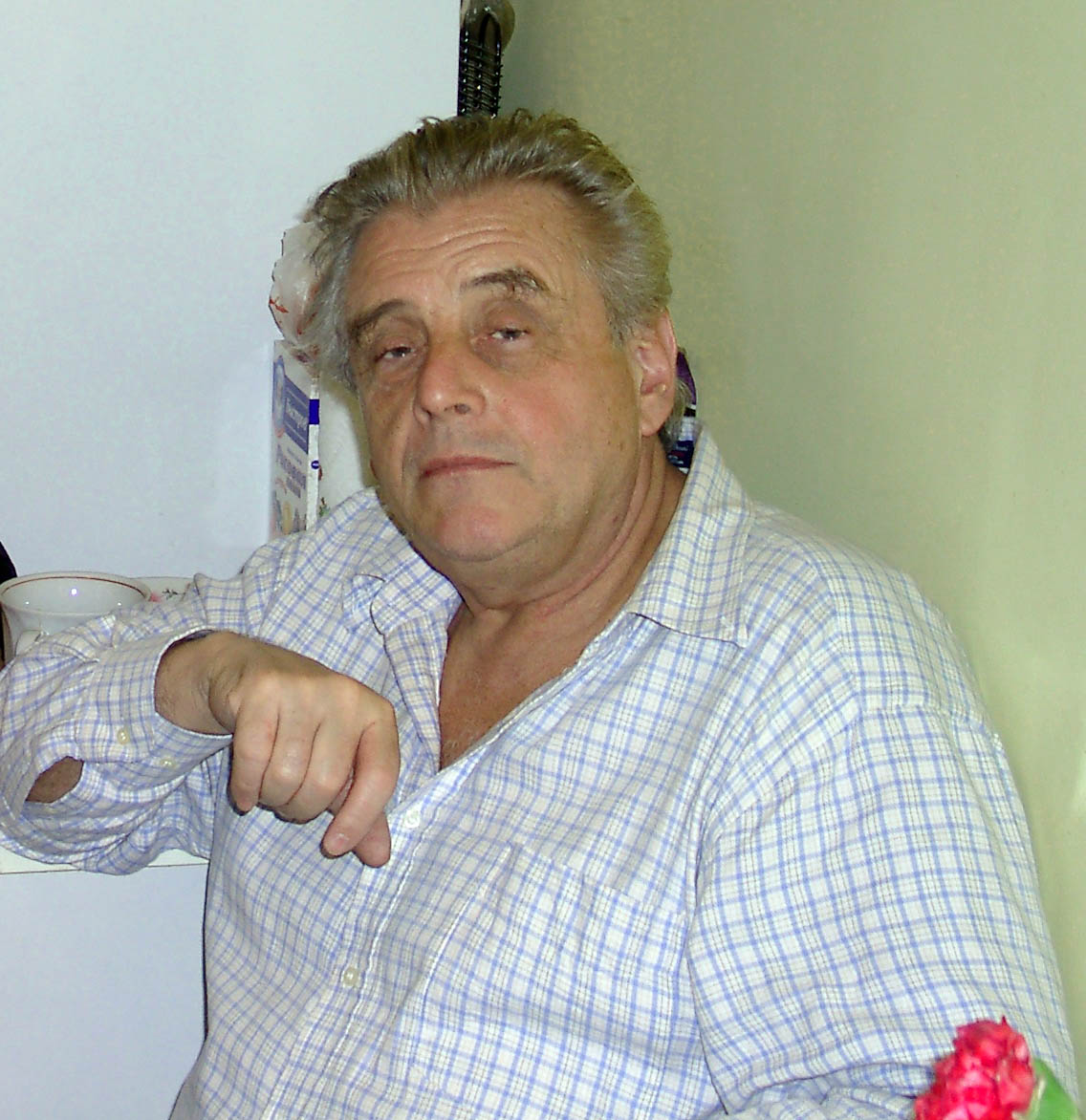
Andrei Toom in 2004

Andrei Leonovich Toom (in Russian: Андрей Леонович Тоом), also known as André Toom, (1942 in Tashkent, Soviet Union – 2022 in New York, US) was a mathematician known for the Toom–Cook algorithm and Toom's rule. Toom was a professor of the statistics department at Federal University of Pernambuco in Brazil. He was arrested in Boa Viagem, Recife, Brazil, in 2005 following allegations of sexual abuse involving a 16-year-old. He was later acquitted.

Toom was a student of Ilya Piatetski-Shapiro. His father was the Russian-Estonian poet Leon Toom (ru). His grandfather was known soviet poet Pavel Antokolsky.

At the age of 80, Toom died of prolonged illness on September 29th, 2022, in Queens, New York.

At his time of death, he had two children (one late), and one grandchild.
