= Negacyclic convolution =

In mathematics, negacyclic convolution is a convolution between two vectors $\mathbf x =(x_1, \dots, x_n)$ and $\mathbf y= (y_1, ..., y_n)$, giving the vector $\mathbf z$ whose components are defined as

$z_k = x_0 y_k + \cdots + x_k y_0 - (x_{k+1}y_{n-1} + \cdots + x_n y_{k+1}).$

It is also called skew circular convolution or wrapped convolution. It results from multiplication of a skew circulant matrix, generated by vector a, with vector b.

== See also ==
- Circular convolution theorem
- Circular convolution (a.k.a. cyclic convolution)
