= Yuri Ofman =

Russian mathematician (born 1939)

Yuri Petrovich Ofman (Russian: Ю́рий Петро́вич Офман, born 1939) is a Russian mathematician who works in computational complexity theory.

He obtained his Doctorate from Moscow State University, where he was advised by Andrey Kolmogorov. He did important early work on parallel algorithms for prefix sums and their application in the design of Boolean circuits for addition.

== Publications ==
- "О приближенной реализации непрерывных функций на автоматах" [On the approximate realization of continuous functions on automata]. Doklady Akademii Nauk SSSR. 152 (4): 823–826. 1963.
- "Об алгоритмической сложности дискретных функций" [On the algorithmic complexity of discrete functions]. Doklady Akademii Nauk SSSR. 145 (1): 48–51. 1962. Translated in Soviet Physics Doklady. 7: 589.
- Anatolii A. Karatsuba and Yu. P. Ofman (1962), "Умножение многозначных чисел на автоматах" ("Multiplication of Many-Digital Numbers by Automatic Computers"), Doklady Akademii Nauk SSSR, vol. 146, pages 293–294. (Published by A. N. Kolmogorov, with two separate results by the two authors.)
- Yu. P. Ofman (1965), "A universal automaton". Transactions of the Moscow Mathemathematical Society, volume 14, pages 200–215.
