= Counting hierarchy =

Concept in computational complexity

In complexity theory, the counting hierarchy is a hierarchy of complexity classes. It is analogous to the polynomial hierarchy, but with NP replaced with PP. It was defined in 1986 by Klaus Wagner.

More precisely, the zero-th level is C_{0}P = P, and the (n+1)-th level is C_{n+1}P = PP^{C_{n}P} (i.e., PP with oracle C_{n}). Thus:

- C_{0}P = P
- C_{1}P = PP
- C_{2}P = PP^{PP}
- C_{3}P = PP^{PP^{PP}}
- ...

The counting hierarchy is contained within PSPACE. By Toda's theorem, the polynomial hierarchy PH is entirely contained in P^{PP}, and therefore in C_{2}P = PP^{PP}.
