= National Numeracy Strategy =

Primary mathematics education structure in England

The National Numeracy Strategy was designed to facilitate a sound grounding in maths for all primary school pupils. It arose out of the National Numeracy Project in 1996, led by a Numeracy Task Force in England, and was launched in 1998 and implemented in schools in 1999. The strategy included an outline of expected teaching in mathematics for all pupils from Reception to Year 6.

In 2003, the strategy, including the framework for teaching, was absorbed into the broader Primary National Strategy. The framework for teaching was then updated in 2006, but ceased to operate in 2011.

== See also ==
- National Curriculum (England, Wales and Northern Ireland)
- Key Stage
- Chunking (division)
- Grid method multiplication
- Number bond
