= Grisebach =

Grisebach is a German surname. Notable people with this surname include:

- Agnes-Marie Grisebach (1913-2011), German actor and writer
- August Grisebach, German botanist and phytogeographer
- Hans Grisebach, German architect
- Ludolf Grisebach, German film editor
- Valeska Grisebach, German film director
