= Freiwald =

Freiwald may refer to:

== Places ==
- Freiwald, the Austrian part of the Gratzen Mountains

== People ==
- Eric Freiwald (1927–2010), American TV writer
- Friedrich Freiwald (1911–1974), a member of the 7th Bundestag, Germany
- Jürgen Freiwald (1940–2014), German volleyball player

== See also ==
- Freivalds, a surname
- Gustav Freiwald House, in Portland, Oregon, US
