= Freivalds =

Freivalds is a surname. Notable people with the surname include:

- Laila Freivalds (born 1942), Swedish politician
- Rūsiņš Mārtiņš Freivalds (1942–2016), Latvian mathematician
  - Freivalds' algorithm
