= Cesvaine Municipality =

Former municipality of Latvia

Coordinates: 56.9706°N 26.3054°E

Cesvaine Municipality Cesvaines novads
- Former municipality
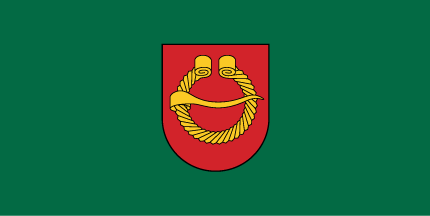
- Flag Coat of arms

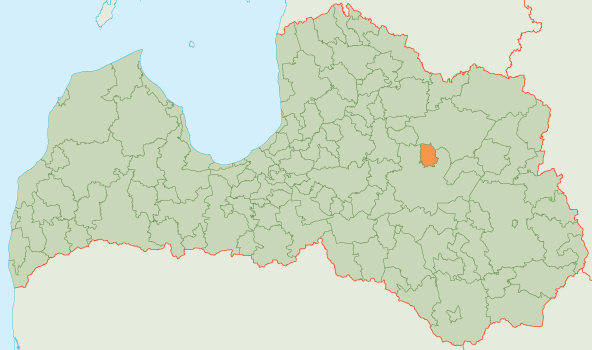
- Country: Latvia
- Formed: 2009
- Dissolved: 2021
- Centre: Cesvaine

Government
  - Chairman (last): Vilnis Špats (V/For Our Municipality)

Area
  - Total: 190.37 km^{2} (73.50 sq mi)
  - Land: 186.22 km^{2} (71.90 sq mi)
  - Water: 4.15 km^{2} (1.60 sq mi)

Population (2021)
  - Total: 2,253
  - Density: 12.10/km^{2} (31.34/sq mi)
- Website: www.cesvaine.lv

Cesvaine Municipality (Latvian: Cesvaines novads) is a former municipality in Vidzeme, Latvia. The municipality was formed in 2009 by reorganization of Cesvaine town with its rural territory, the administrative centre being Cesvaine. In 2010 Cesvaine Parish was created from the rural territory of Cesvaine town. As of 2020, the population was 2,266.

On 1 July 2021, Cesvaine Municipality ceased to exist and its territory was merged into Madona Municipality.

== Administrative divisions ==
- Cesvaine
- Cesvaine Parish

== Twin towns — sister cities ==
Cesvaine was twinned with:

- Coulaines, France
- Dnipropetrovsk Oblast, Ukraine
- Lagardelle-sur-Lèze, France
- Märjamaa, Estonia
- Volkhov, Russia
- Weyhe, Germany

== Gallery ==
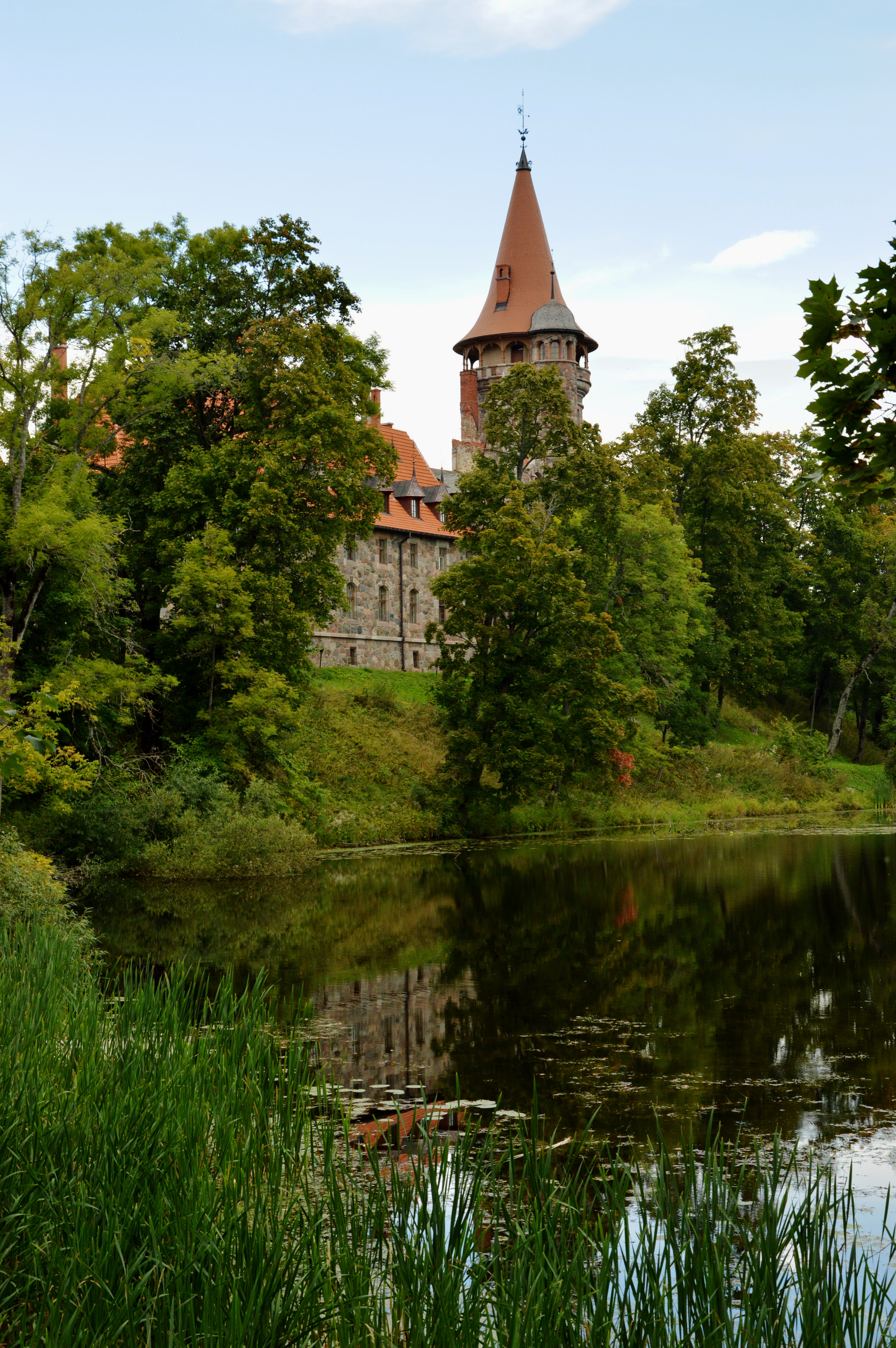
Cesvaine Palace

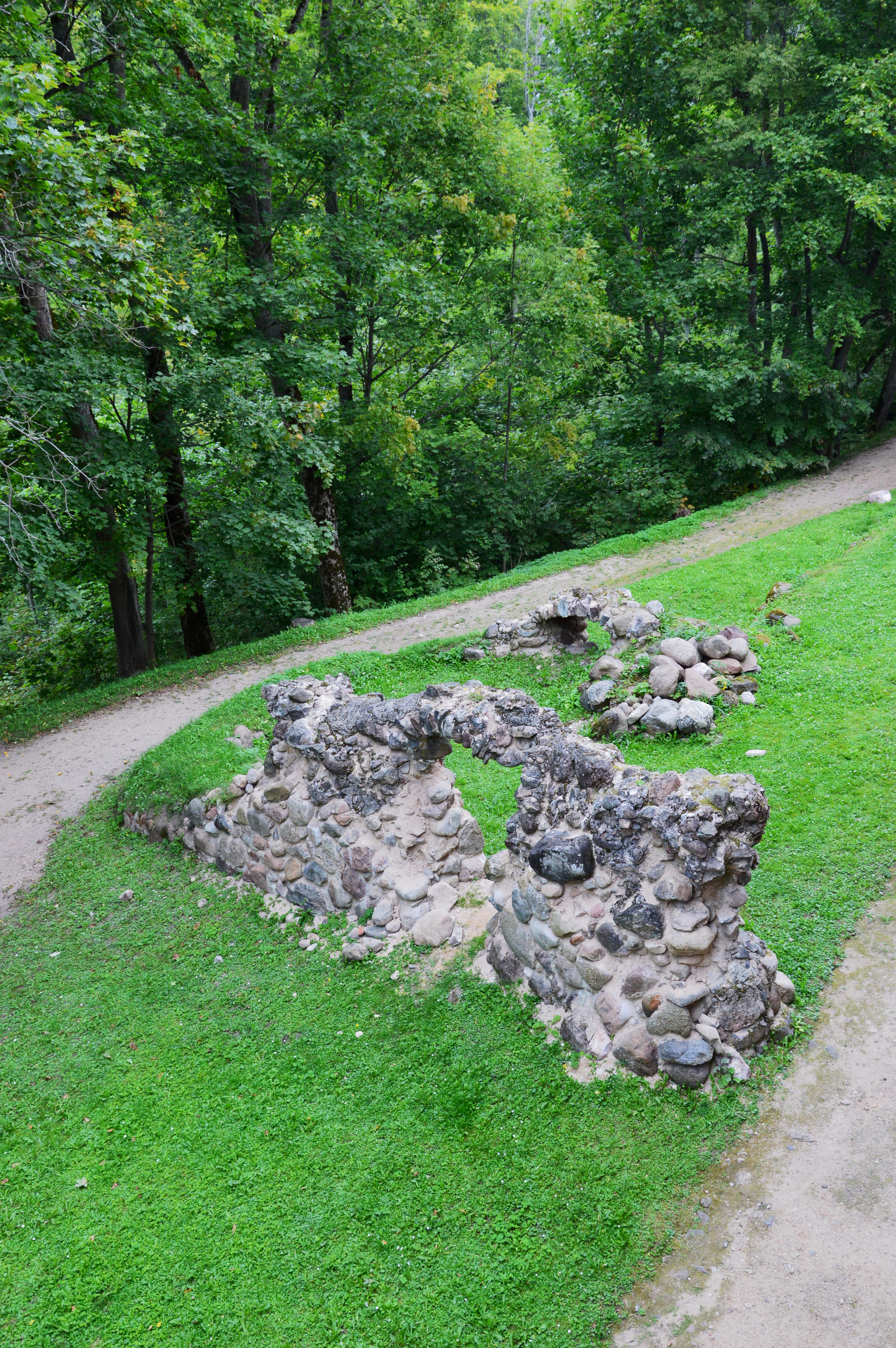
Cesvaine Castle ruins

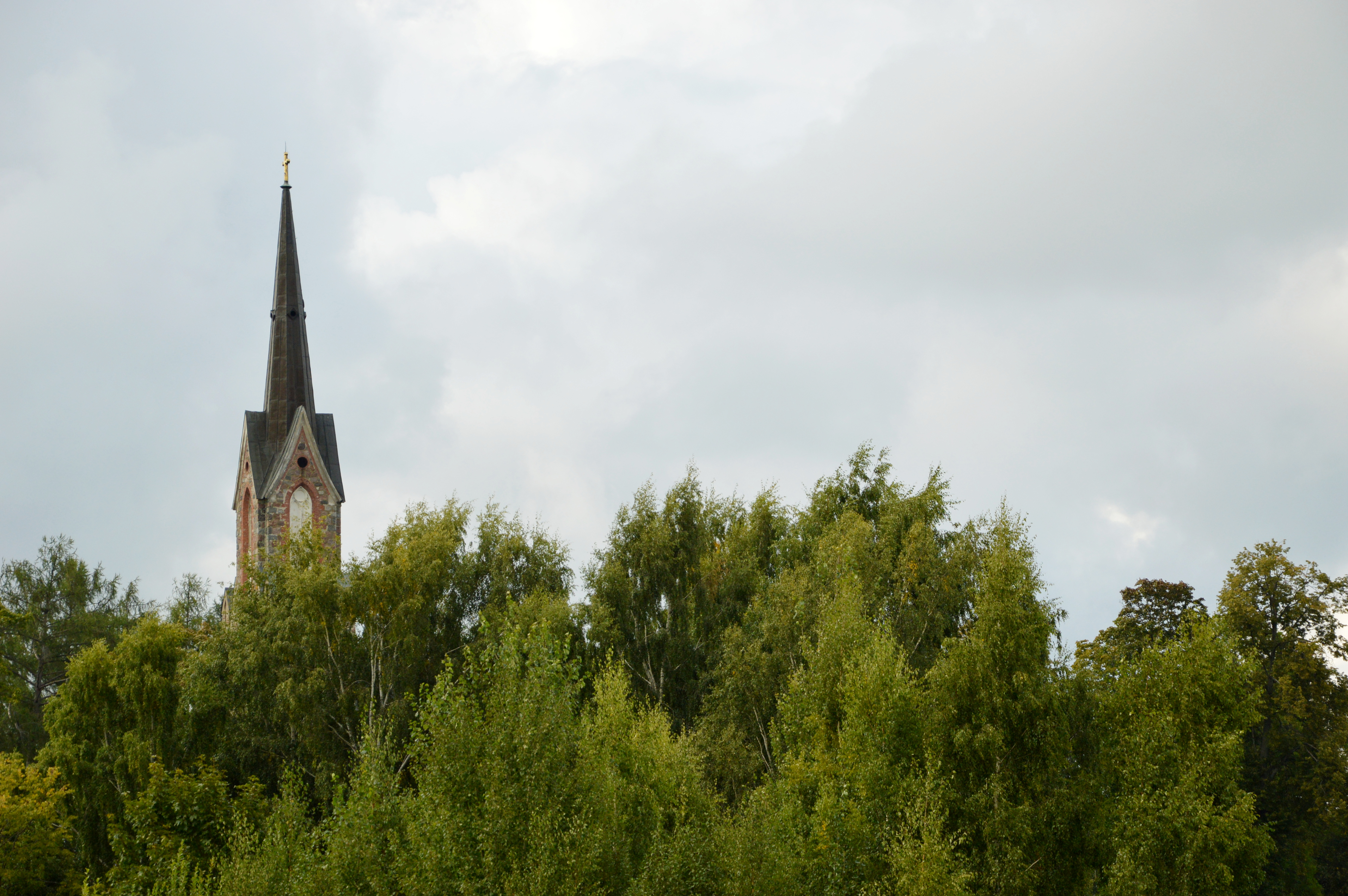
Cesvaine Lutheran Church

== See also ==
- Administrative divisions of Latvia
