= Capernaum Church =

Church building in Mitte, Germany

- Kapernaum-Kirche
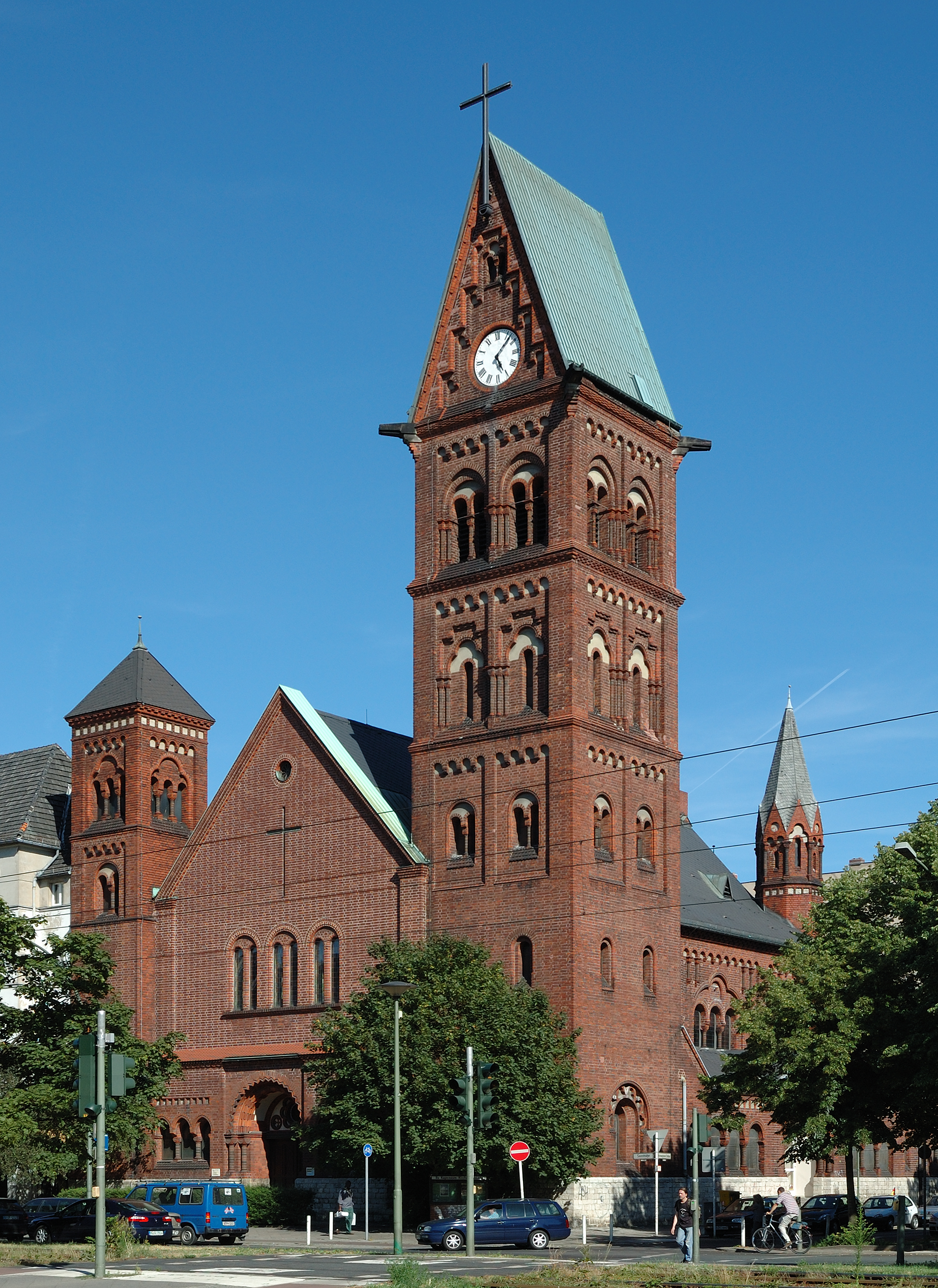
- View from northwest over Seestraße towards the church at the T-junction with Antwerpener Straße

Religion
- Affiliation: Lutheran
- District: Sprengel Berlin (region), Kirchenkreis Berlin Nord-Ost (deanery)
- Province: Evangelical Church of Berlin-Brandenburg-Silesian Upper Lusatia

Location
- Location: Wedding, a locality of Berlin
- Interactive map of Capernaum Church
- Coordinates: 52°32′54″N 13°20′58″E

Architecture
- Architects: Carl Siebold, reconstructors Fritz Berndt and Günter Behrmann
- Style: Romanesque Revival
- Completed: 1900–1902, destroyed 1944 and 1945, reconstructed 1952–1959
- Materials: brick

Capernaum Church (German: Kapernaum-Kirche) is one of the two places of worship of the Lutheran Capernaum Congregation, a member of the Evangelical Church of Berlin-Brandenburg-Silesian Upper Lusatia, an umbrella comprising Lutheran, Calvinist (Reformed) and united Protestant congregations. The church is located on Seestraße No. 34 in the locality of Wedding, in Berlin's borough of Mitte. The church was named after Capernaum, today Kfar Nachum כפר נחום (literally "Nachum's village"; transliteration in Greek: Kαφαρναουμ and in Latin: Capernaum) in today's Israel.

Christians revere the town of Capernaum, since on Sabbaths Jesus of Nazareth used to teach in the local synagogue (cf. Gospel of Luke 4:31–44). The synagogue where Jesus possibly taught is a handsome, standing ruin open to visitors. Therefore, it is likely that the town has been the home of Jesus (cf. Gospel of Matthew 4:13), at least for some time. In Capernaum also, Jesus allegedly healed a man, and a fever in Simon Peter's mother-in-law. (Note: Besides Simon Peter (Hebrew: שמעון בר-יונה; translit. Shim'on Bar-Yonah, nicknamed: Keipha Hebrew: כיפא), Capernaum is reported to have been the home of the following Apostles: Simon Peter's brother Andrew (Greek: 'Ανδρέας), James, son of Zebedee (Hebrew: יעקב בר זבדי, translit. Ya'aqov Bar-Zebdi), his brother John (Hebrew: יוחנן בר זבדי, translit. Yochanan Bar-Zebdi), and the publican Matthew Alphaei or Levi (Hebrew: מתיה בן חלפי or לוי; cf. Gospel of Luke).)

== Congregation and church ==
The area belonged previously to the Nazareth Congregation, the oldest in Wedding. Due to the high number of new parishioners moving in at the end of the 19th century the Nazareth Church grew too small. Count Eduard Karl von Oppersdorf, who purchased many grounds along Seestraße in order to develop them as building land, offered to donate a site for a new church and a considerable sum of money to build it. He considered a prestigious site on a square to be developed in Antwerpener Straße, but Berlin's planning and zoning board refused to approve that. Thus he offered the site on the crossroads of Seestraße #34/35 with Antwerpener Straße No. 50 on the condition of starting the constructions until a certain date, otherwise the tendered money would be forfeited. Oppersdorf speculated for a rise of land prices by the establishment of a church in the area.

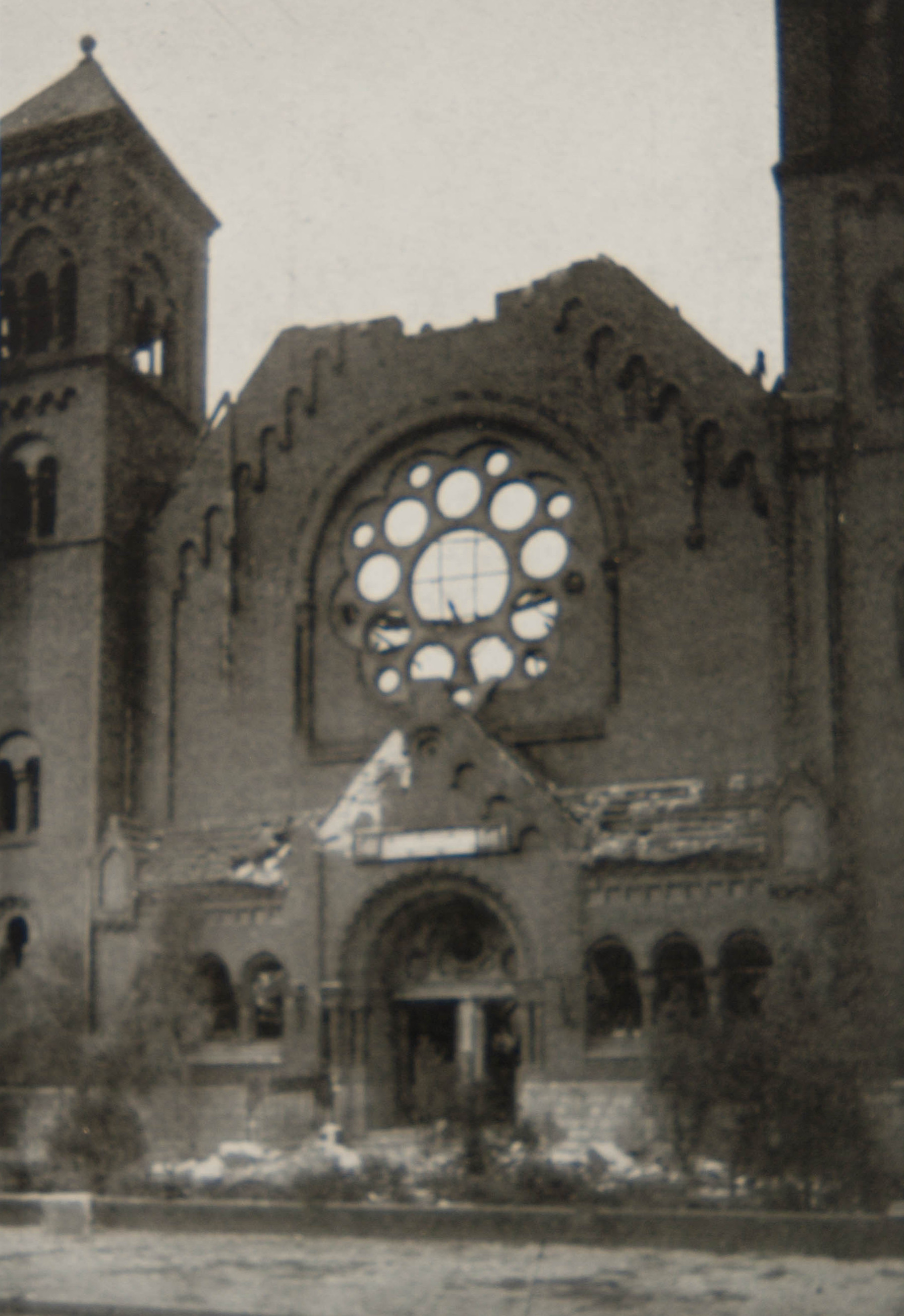
The gable towards Seestraße after its destruction in 1944

Thus in 1896 the presbytery (German: Gemeindekirchenrat) of Nazareth Congregation, presided by Pastor Ludwig Diestelkamp, commissioned the architect Baurat. (Note: Literally: Building Councillor, an honorary title granted to prominent architects in the period prior 1918.) Carl Siebold from Bethel (a part of today's Bielefeld), then leading the construction department of the Bethel Institution, to build an additional church in the undeveloped area. Diestelkamp knew Siebold through his friend Friedrich von Bodelschwingh. On 30 September 1897 the cornerstone was hastily laid. Effective constructions were only started in 1900.

Siebold, who built almost 80 churches, many of them in Westphalia, recycled his design for Christ Church in Hagen-Eilpe, which he adapted to the site on Seestraße. On 22 July 1902 the church was finished. The Evangelical Association for the Construction of Churches (German: Evangelischer Kirchenbauverein), a charitable organisation then headed by the Prussian Queen Augusta Victoria, co-financed the constructions. On 26 August the same year she, her son Crown Prince Frederick William and her husband King William II attended the inauguration of Capernaum Church, the latter in his then function as summus episcopus (Supreme Governor of the Evangelical State Church of Prussia's older Provinces).

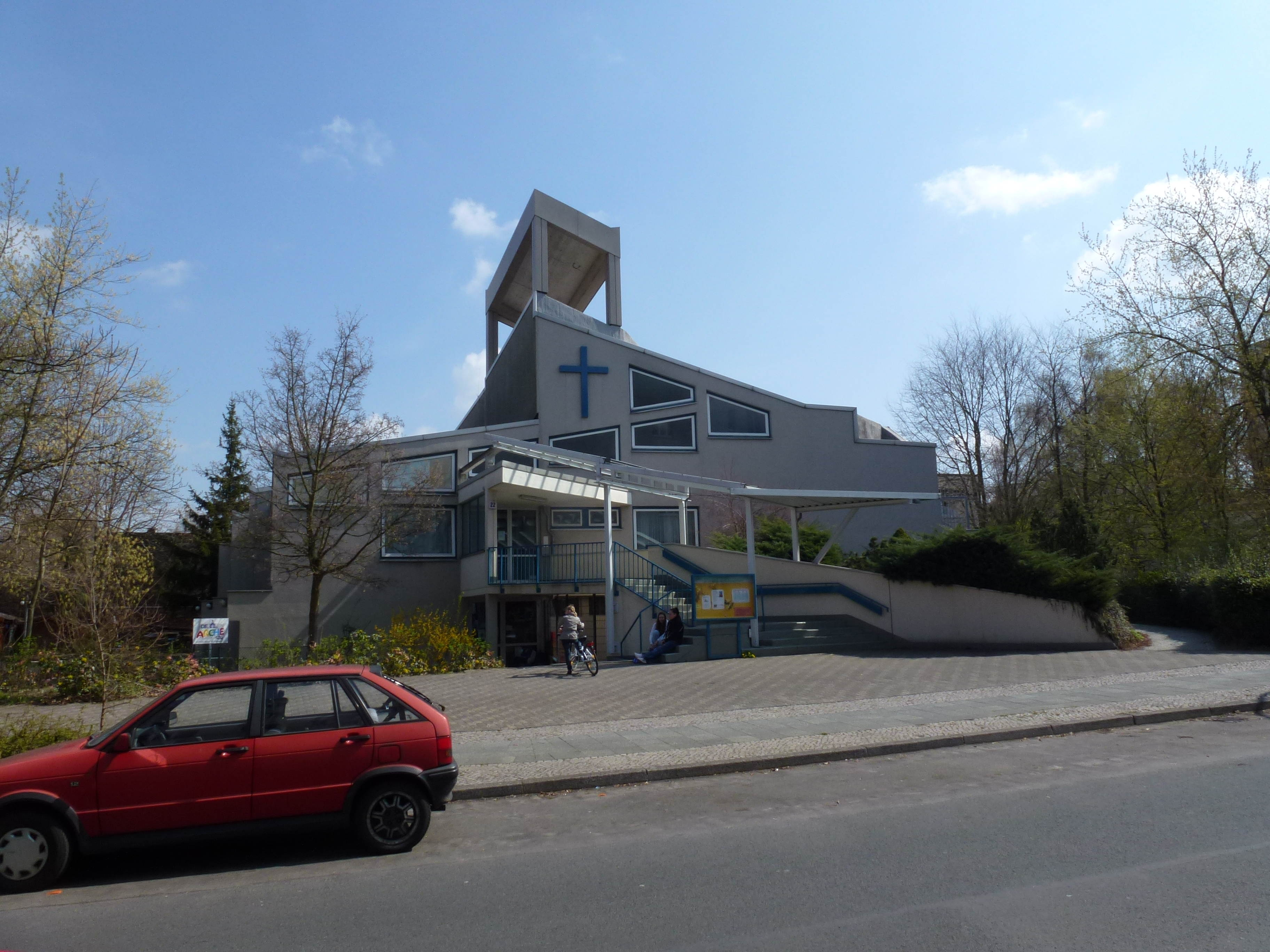
Schillerhöhe parish hall of the congregation

In the following year the Capernaum Congregation was constituted as independent legal entity, within the then Protestant umbrella Evangelical State Church of Prussia's older Provinces. The new congregation took over the northwestern part of the parish of the Nazareth Congregation, which is the northwestern part of the locality of Wedding, including the African Quarter (German: Afrikanisches Viertel) north of the church building and the Schillerhöhe northeast of the church building.

== Building ==
Due to the location of the site the church is not oriented, but directed to the southeast. The building consists of three longish naves on an asymmetric ground plan. While the northeastern nave is large and harbours a loft, in order to place more seats, the southwestern nave to Antwerpener Straße is narrow, rather resembling an aisle.

The outside structure of Romanesque Revivalism, built from red brick, with its Lombard bands and the entrance hall to Antwerpener Straße rather resembles a basilica. Siebold's design is inspired by Romanesque architecture of Rhenish churches such as St. Apostles, and Great St. Martin Church (both Cologne).

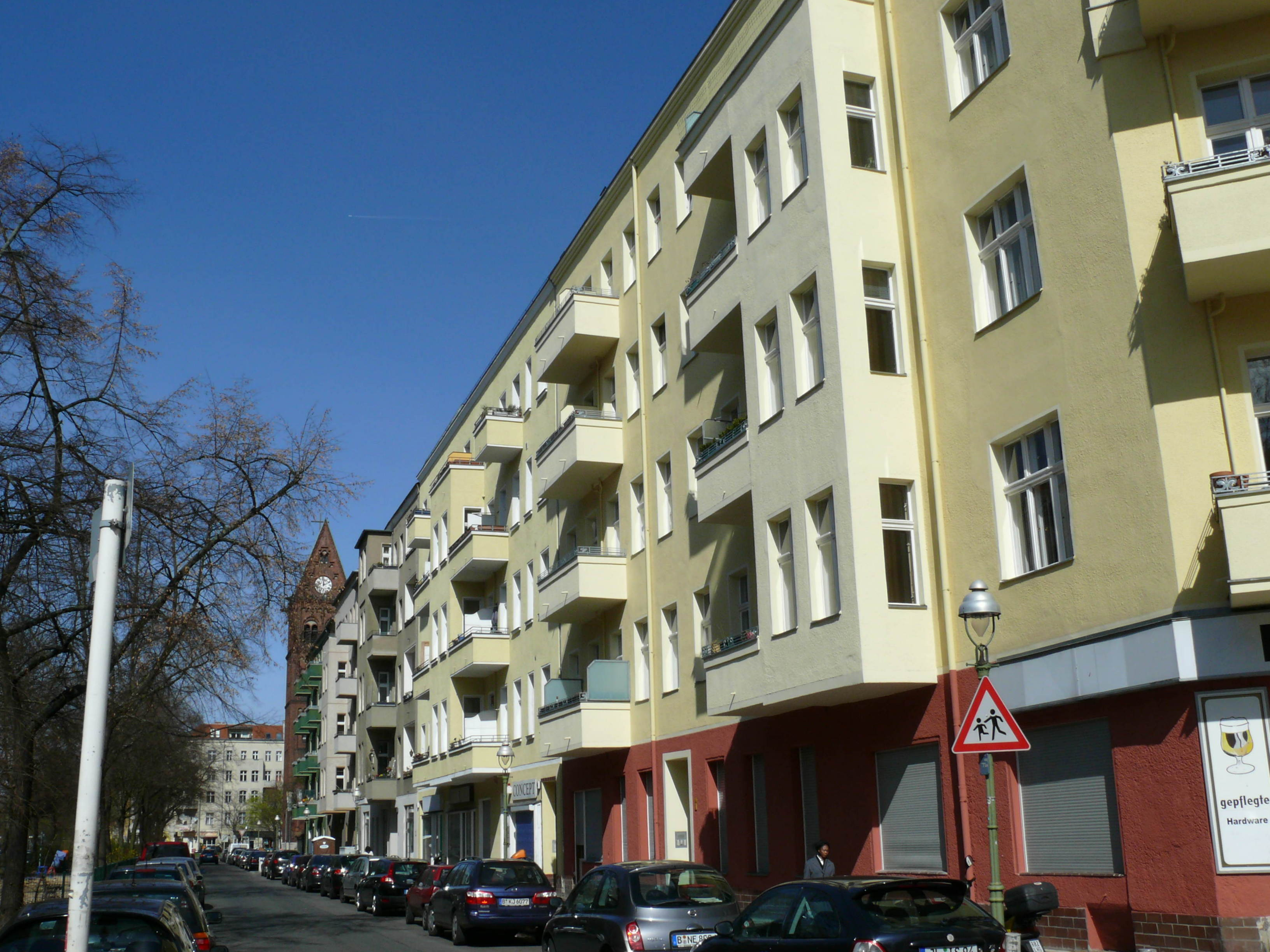
View through Antwerpener Straße towards Seestraße with the tower of Capernaum Church

The quire is highlighted by two octagonal towers, which are connected by a columned gallery of arcades (German: Zwerchgalerie). The room underneath the elevated quire was designed for the instruction of confirmands, thus being an early example of a structure combining church and community centre functions.

The tower at the crossroads of Seestraße with Antwerpener Straße, topped by a typical Rhenish steep rhombohedral spire, was built to form a landmark. Siebold designed it after the towers of St Mary's Assumption Church (for a picture see Andernach). The façade to Seestraße showed a great rose window. A second, considerably smaller tower connects the church building to the alignment of houses in Seestraße. In 1909 August Dinklage, Olaf Lilloe, and Ernst Paulus added a rectory in Rundbogenstil with round-arched windows in Seestraße #35, finished on 1 April 1911, thus aligning the church with the surrounding houses. The rear wing of the rectory confines the backyard of church and rectory as a semi-closed court.

== Destruction and Reconstruction ==
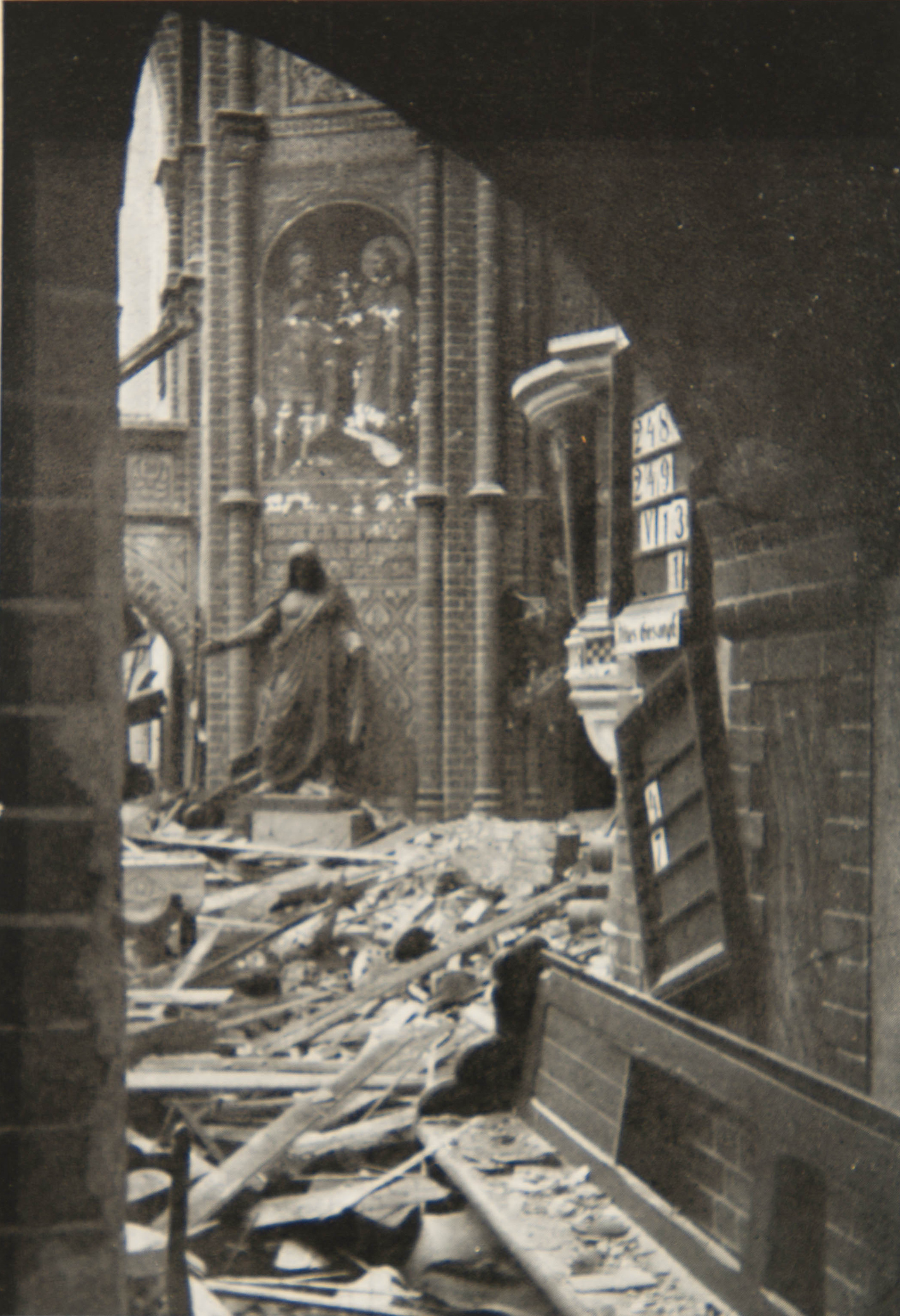
The interior in ruins and filled with rubble, 1944

The Allied bombing of Berlin in World War II inflicted severe damages on Capernaum Church. In May 1944 the church completely burnt out to the outside walls, in February 1945 the main tower was also hit and burnt out.

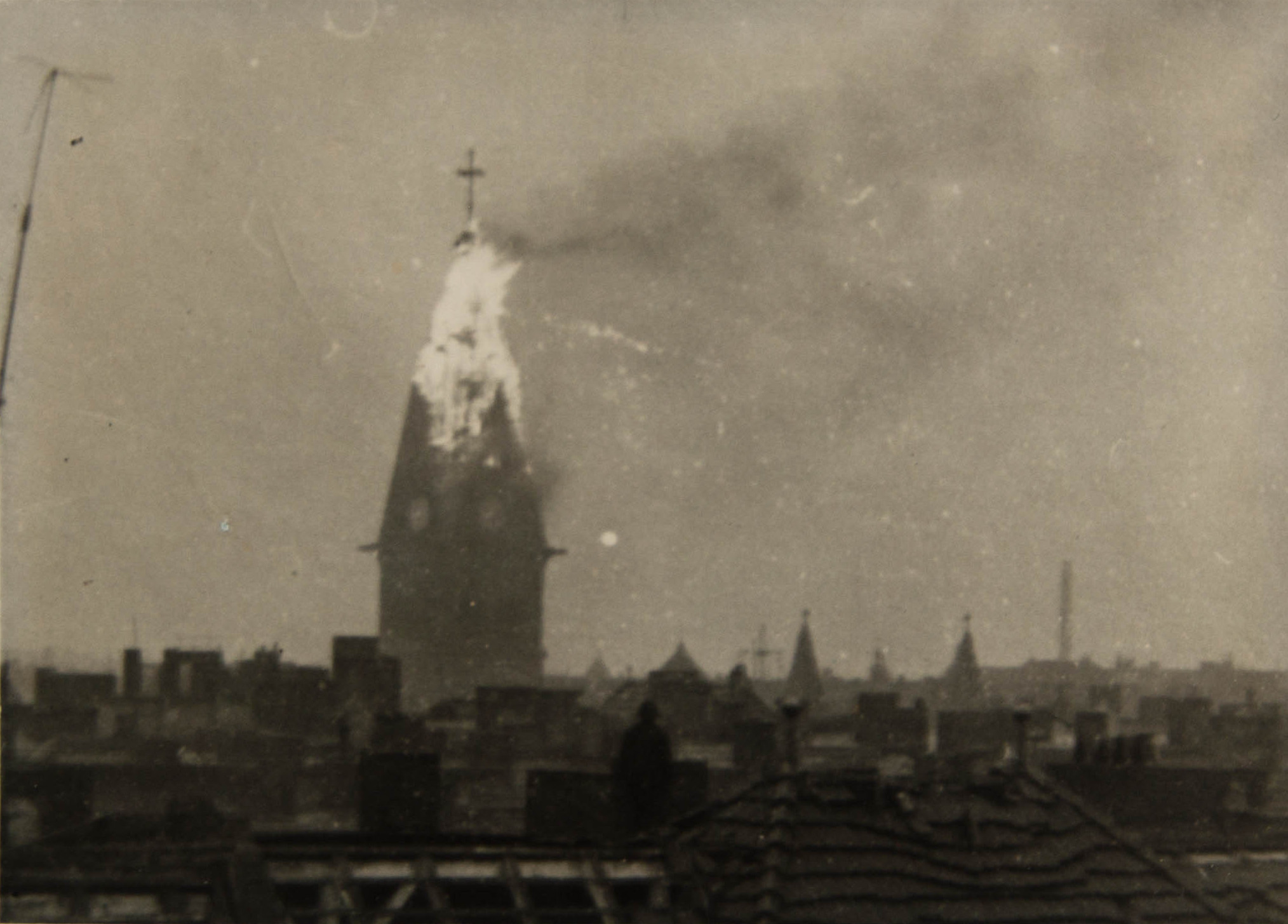
The main tower burning, 1945

Starting in 1952 the architect Fritz Berndt began the reconstructions, accomplished by architect Günter Behrmann until 1959. The structures were simplified, the rose window was replaced by three biforium windows, while the main tower now bears a steep gable roof. The gable towards Seestraße was simplified due to the new simple gable roof, covering the main nave, the side naves carry catslide roofs, thus the nave to Antwerpener Straße lost its spire lights. The church was re-inaugurated on the occasion of the feast of Evangelical New Year (so-called First Sunday of Advent) on 29 November 1959.

== Furnishings ==
Originally the church was sparingly furnished. The main nave was not vaulted but covered by a wooden ceiling, repeating in the middle the gable-roof form of the outside roof. Both side naves had even ceilings, supported by columns with cubic capitals. The lofts opened through three wide arches into the main nave.

Mural paintings repeated Lombard bands and Romanesque ornaments. The quire was elaborately decorated with mural paintings typical for the Evangelical churches of the end of the 19th century. The apsis painting displayed an enthroned Jesus of Nazareth in a mandorla surrounded by angels alternating with palms. A painting on the tympanum on top of the apsis depicted the Roman Centurion asking Jesus to heal his servant (Gospel of Matthew, 8:5–13). Stained glass windows of ornamental and figured design in the apsis continued the rich colourfulness of the quire. All this was destroyed in May 1944.

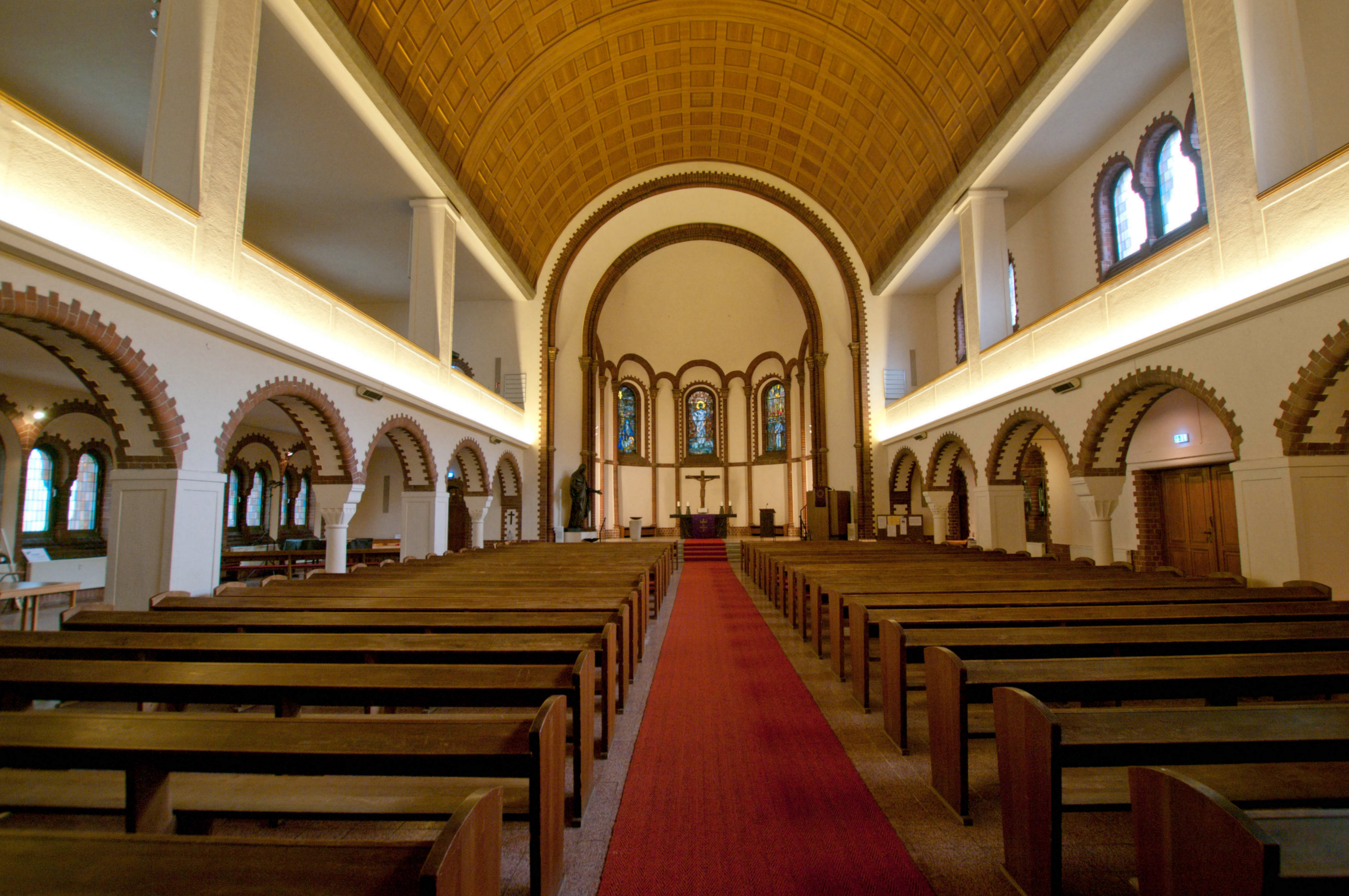
Interior towards the apsis in 2016

The new interior of 1959 under a wooden barrel vault is very plain. Behrmann created a new altar and a new pulpit. Eva Limberg (Bielefeld) designed the new christening bowl, the candlestick, carried by Apostle figures, and the lectern, depicting the scene of the Roman Centurion and Jesus. In 1958 August Wagner created new coloured windows above the altar, after the design of the Hermann Kirchberger. The windows depict the Benedictive Jesus, the Nativity of Jesus, and the Descent of the Holy Spirit (Pentecost). A surviving element of the original furnishing is a larger than life-sized copied statue of the benedictive Jesus after the famous statue by Bertel Thorvaldsen.

== The Capernaum Congregation in the Nazi Era ==
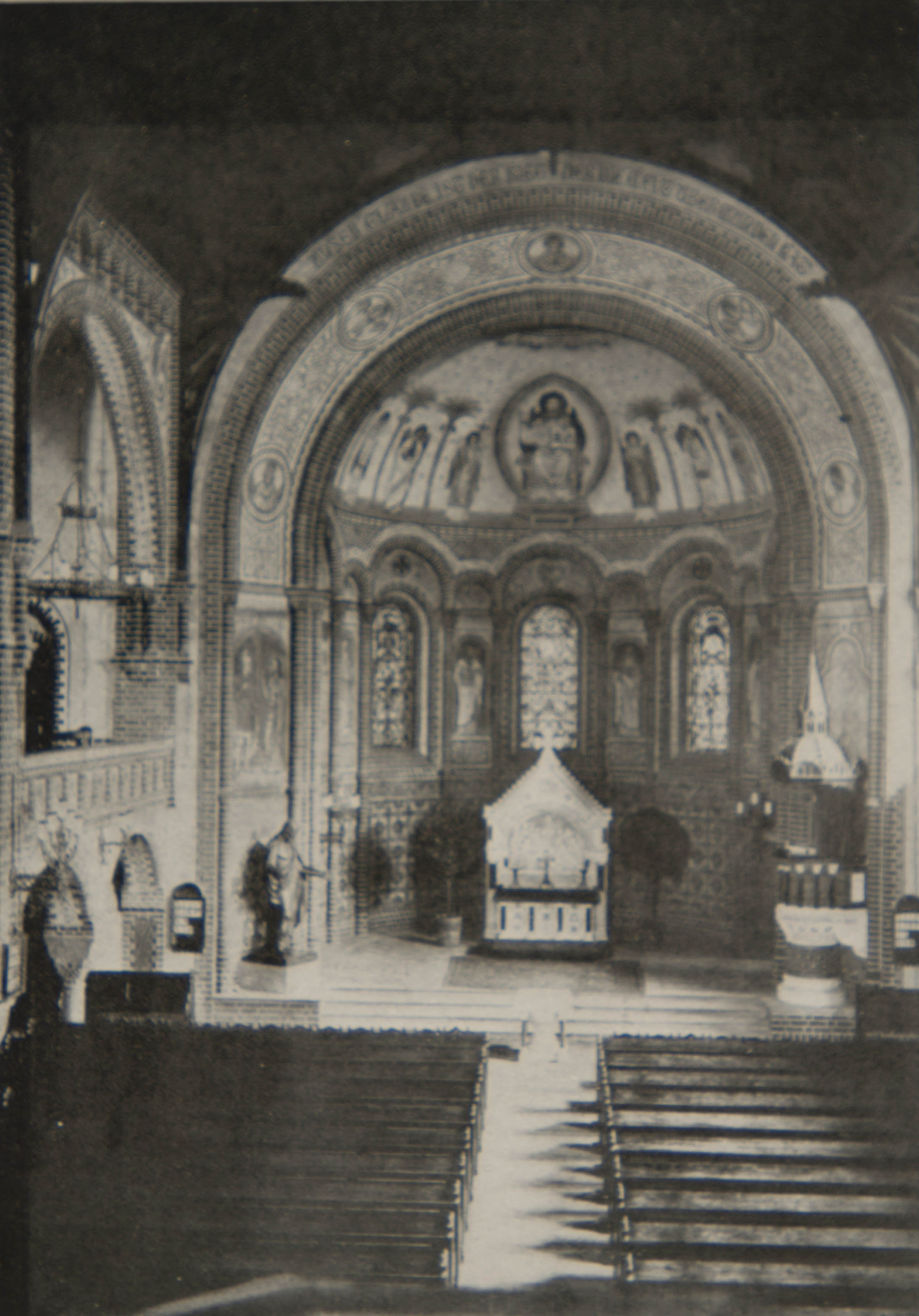
Apsis before 1944

After the premature re-election of presbyters and synodals on 23 July 1933, which the Nazi government had imposed onto all Protestant church bodies in Germany (see Evangelical Church of the old-Prussian Union), the Nazi partisan Protestant so-called Faith Movement of German Christians gained a majority in the presbytery of the Capernaum Congregation, like in most congregations within the Evangelical Church of the old-Prussian Union. With the new majorities on all levels of church organisation the German Christians systematically tried to subject any unadulterated form of Protestantism by way of firing church employees of other opinion, blocking church property for non-Nazi Protestant groups, prohibiting collections for other purposes than the officially approved ones.

The majorities of German Christian synodals – first in the provincial synod of Brandenburg (24 August 1933), competent for the Berlin and Brandenburg subsection, and then in the General Synod of the overall Evangelical Church of the old-Prussian Union (5/6 September 1933) – voted in the so-called Aryan paragraph (German: Arierparagraph), meaning that employees of the Evangelical Church of the old-Prussian Union – being all baptised Protestant church members -, who had grandparents, who were enrolled as Jews, or who were married with such persons, were all to be fired.

On 11 September 1933 Gerhard Jacobi (in German), pastor of the William I Memorial Church in Berlin, leading the opposing synodals, gathered opposing pastors, who clearly saw the breach of Christian and Protestant principles and founded the Emergency Covenant of Pastors (German: Pfarrernotbund), presided by Pastor Martin Niemöller. Its members concluded that a schism was unavoidable, a new Protestant church was to be established, since the official organisation was anti-Christian, heretical and therefore illegitimate.

Three out of six pastors of the Capernaum Congregation joined the Covenant to wit Karl Berlich, Helmut Petzold, and Friedrich Lahde, the latter holding as senior pastor the office of chief executive of the presbytery, dominated by German Christians since the imposed re-election. In 1933 among the pastors of Berlin, 160 stuck to Gospel and Church (the official name of the list of Nazi-opposing candidates in the re-election, most joined the Covenant), 40 were German Christians while another 200 had taken neither side. The same was true for the average parishioners, the vast majority did not bother being non-observant, many did not even participate in the elections, those who did, often voted for the German Christians, but in the following Struggle of the Churches (German: Kirchenkampf), they never acted up as German Christian activists. The Kirchenkampf was an enactment performed by two minority groups within a rather indifferent majority.

As part of the re-election campaign the Nazi government and the Nazi party promoted that Nazi party members of Protestant descent, who were not members of the Evangelical Church of the old-Prussian Union, would (re-)join that church body in order to secure a clear majority of votes for the Nazi group of the German Christians. In 1933 the Capernaum Congregation reached a number of about 70,000 parishioners through these tactical mass enlistments. Once the interest of the Nazi leadership, to convert official Protestantism into a Nazi movement, faded due to the ongoing problems with opponents from within the churches, the policy changed. Many Nazis, being anyway non-observing Protestants, seceded again from the Evangelical Church of the old-Prussian Union and the number of parishioners of the Capernaum Congregation dropped to 41,000 by 1935.

The existing majorities in the bodies on the different levels of church organisation remained, since in the synods the majority of German Christian synodals had voted for an abolition of further church elections. Parishioners' democratic participation by elections only re-emerged after the end of the Nazi reign. The Nazi government preferred the Protestant church bodies to weaken their influence in Germany by letting them enter into a destructive self-deprecation, once in while orchestrated by Nazi government interference in favour of the German Christians, but mostly in favour of the Protestant church bodies' dropping into insignificance.

The pastors of the Emergency Covenant of Pastors advanced their project of a new Protestant church and organised their own synods with synodals representing the intra-church opposition. The movement declared Protestantism was based on the complete Holy Scripture, the Old Covenant of Jewish heritage, and the New Covenant. The participants declared this basis to be binding for any Protestant Church deserving that name and confessed their allegiance to this basis (see Barmen Theological Declaration). Henceforth the movement of all Protestant denominations, opposing Nazi intrusion into Protestant church affairs, was called the Confessing Church (German: Bekennende Kirche, BK), their partisans Confessing Christians, as opposed to German Christians (German: Deutsche Christen, DC). In any congregation, whose presbytery was dominated by German Christians, parallel structures were to be built up. The parallel entity for the presbytery was called the brethren council (German: Bruderrat).

Pastor Berlich gathered opposing activist parishioners to form a Confessing Christian congregation. The double role of the pastors, paid by the official church body and thus also obliged to fulfill the regular services for the Capernaum Congregation and their parallel activity as Confessing Christians turned out to be a precarious balancing act. Official services were attended by denunciators, who would report any critical utterance to the Gestapo, while German Christian parishioners and presbyters would inflict disciplinary procedures through the superior levels of the official church body.

Services and other meetings of Confessing Christians had to take place as private events, thus only true Confessing Christians would be admitted, who had to identify by red cards of membership, which were issued by confidants only. 380 parishioners of the Capernaum Congregation were card-carrying Confessing Christians. Compared with other congregations in the north of Berlin this was a great number of Confessing Christians. They elected their own brethren council consisting of the installer Mr Bolz, Mrs Brandt, Mr Grundt, the parochial vicar Ilse Kersten, the merchant Mr Komnow, inspector Mr Krummrei, Mrs Ranitz, and Mrs Rosendahl. However, even though the Confessing Christian congregation at Capernaum Church had a stable and considerable membership, the congregation did not hold regular rogation prayers for those persecuted by the Nazi regime and the three Confessing Christian pastors did not participate regularly in the meetings of the Emergency Covenant of Pastors on the regional, let alone the Berlin-wide level. The three pastors, who had not taken sides, did not bother their three Confessing Christian colleagues. All the fighting was promoted by German Christian presbyters and other parishioners.

A particular problem was fund-raising. The Confessing Christians depended completely on offertories, since the official church bodies did not share their revenues from the contributions levied from the parishioners by way of a surcharge on the income tax (so-called Church tax), collected and then transferred by the state tax offices. To block any access to funds, in 1934 the Nazi government subjected any form of public money collection to state approval, which was regularly denied if Confessing Christians applied for it. So door-to-door collections became a dangerous, but necessary thing. In the parish of the Capernaum Congregation, never anybody denounced the collectors, while in other, particularly more rural parishes many a Confessing Christian cleric and layman or laywoman was denounced and subsequently taken to court.

At the beginning of November 1934 the official presbytery, dominated by German Christians, reached the dismissal of Lahde as executive chief of the Capernaum Congregation for his allegiance with the Confessing Christians by the fickle superior cleric in charge, Superintendent Dr. Johannes Rosenfeld. Lacking any substantial basis for this decision, Lahde reached his reappointment on 19 December.

In 1935 the Confessing Christian pastor Petzold left the Capernaum Congregation. Thus a dispute between the German Christian presbytery and its executive chief Lahde arose. While Lahde, fearing the appointment of a new German Christian pastor, argued the diminished number of parishioners would not allow the employment of another pastor, the presbytery under the merchant Ebeling demanded a new pastor. On 19 October 1935 the March of Brandenburg provincial consistory (the competent executive and clerical body) agreed to restaff the vacancy. On 18 November the presbytery thus chose the orthodox German Christian pastor Heyne from the Thuringian Evangelical Church, the church body being at the heart of the Faith Movement of German Christians.

The Confessing Christians in the Capernaum Congregation then started the collection of signatures among the parishioners against Heyne's appointment. They handed in 300 signatures, what made the consistory to change its mind. In order to pacify the situation, it refused any reappointment on 23 November. Only in 1942 the presbytery succeeded and the German Christian pastor Johannes Hoffmann was appointed, coming from Mount of Olives Church in Berlin-Kreuzberg. Among the signatories we find the names of Vicar Kersten, the bookkeeper Dora Mechur, and Pastor Hans Urner (1901–1986; chaplain at the diaconal senior home Paul Gerhardt Stift in the years 1935–1953). These three ran an underground circle to help persons, persecuted by the Nazi regime as Jews, to emigrate.

The institutionally independent foundation of Paul Gerhardt Stift, located in Müllerstraße 58 at the corner with Barfusstraße within the parochial boundaries, was run by deaconesses. The staff was divided in its allegiances to the German Christians and the Confessing Christians. While the institution's two chaplains, Pastor Urner and Pastor Hermann Wagner (Note: Later Wagner was drafted to the Wehrmacht, which preferentially drafted pastors of Confessing Christian allegiance, in order to withdraw them from their parish activity, and he was killed as a soldier in World War II.) stuck with the Confessing Church, the matron deaconess sided with the German Christians. In the morning prayers led by her she included Adolf Hitler in her rogations, while the two pastors on their turn never did so. The deaconess leading the medical station of the Paul Gerhardt Stift, an active Confessing Christian in the neighbouring Nazareth Congregation, and other colleagues of her, continued to treat Jewish patients even after this was strictly forbidden in 1938 and therefore could not be invoiced to the health insurance anymore. (Note: After 1938 German Jews and Gentiles of Jewish descent were all to be treated exclusively by Jewish doctors or hospitals like the neighbouring Jüdisches Krankenhaus Berlin (in German), which therefore were continued to function even after all other Jewish organisations had been dissolved in June 1943. In 1989 Mechur also reported that the diaconal hospital Graf-Botho-Schwerin-Krankenhaus in Berlin-Lichterfelde continued to treat Jewish patients.)

Kersten, Mechur, and Urner were also friends with Pastor Harald Poelchau, who with the Social Democrat Agnes Laukant (Brüsseler Str. 28a), ran another underground circle, hiding persecuted persons.

Lahde was denounced at the Gestapo for his refusal to hoist the swastika flag on Capernaum Church, as did many congregations on certain dates or events of Nazi interest. This earned him an entry in his Gestapo file, collecting material against Lahde. Even after Lahde – due to his weak health – went into early retirement by the end of 1937, the presbytery inflicted a disciplinary procedure on him because of his alleged attitude of treason against the German people and state (German: volks- und staatsverräterische Haltung) in 1938.

The knowledgeable Vicar Kersten (died 25 Oct. 1967), becoming after the war one of the first woman pastors in Berlin, was an important proponent of the Confessing Christians in the Capernaum Congregation. She led the Sunday school of the official Capernaum Congregation and regularly attracted 250 children and juveniles of parents of all allegiances. In the scope of the Confessing Church she held weekly Bible hours in her private apartment in Müllerstraße #97c, until she was bombed out in an allied air raid in February 1945. At the end of these meetings she traded the latest news about murders, arrests, and what was going on in concentration camps, which were concealed by the official Nazi media. Kersten informed about a senior police officer in the local Seestraße precinct, who issued official police documents confirming the Christianness of its bearer, as Mechur recalled in 1989.

Mechur's father was a Jew, but somewhat protected because he was married with a so-called Aryan Protestant, and his daughter was by religion not Jewish, this made the Nazi authorities classify his marriage as a then so-called 'privileged' mixed marriage. German Jews and German Gentiles of Jewish descent living in privileged mixed marriage were in fact spared from deportation. (Note: While in the beginning the Nazi authorities hoped to make the so-called Aryan partner get a divorce from their Jewish-classified spouses, by granting easy legal divorce procedures and opportunities to withhold most of the common property after a divorce. Those, who stuck to their spouse, would suffer discriminations like dismissal from public employment, exclusion from civic society organisations etc. When deportations started people living in mixed marriages were first spared. In March 1943 an attempt to deport the Berlin-based Jews and Gentiles of Jewish descent, living in mixed marriages, failed due to public protest by their relatives-in-law of so-called Aryan kinship (see Rosenstraße protest). A last attempt, undertaken in February/March 1945 ended, because the extermination camps already were liberated. However some were deported to Theresienstadt, of whom most survived the last months until their liberation. In summer 1945 all in all 8,000 Berliners, whom the Nazis had classified as Jews because of 3 or 4 grandparents, who were enrolled as members of Jewish congregations, survived. Their personal faith – like Jewish, Protestant, Catholic or irreligionist – is mostly not recorded, since only the Nazi files report on them, which use the Nazi racial definitions. 4,700 out of the 8,000 survived due to their living in a mixed marriage. 1,400 survived hiding, out of 5,000 who tried. 1,900 had returned from Thesienstadt.) In November 1944 Mr. Mechur died in the Jewish Hospital of Berlin (in German), after he had been badly injured by a falling burning beam during an allied air raid. Dora Mechur recalls that the Christian friends of her family and fellow parishioners attended her father's burial on the Jewish Weißensee Cemetery, which was then a rare sign of sympathy. Many Protestant congregations had ousted their co-parishioners, who were fully or partly of Jewish descent.

In the beginning of the Nazi reign the two groups around Kersten and Poelchau, helping persecuted persons, were mostly helping them to emigrate or to avoid arrest, until a flight abroad could be organised. From 18 October 1941 on, when the deportations of German Jews and Gentiles of Jewish descent from Berlin started, the purpose of hiding persons became a permanent issue. Jews, hiding from deportation, 'dived' in the underground and thus used to call themselves submarines (German: U-Boot).

Pastor Harald Poelchau (in German), since the mid-1930s a parishioner of Capernaum Congregation, was a Christian Socialist. In April 1933 he was appointed prison chaplain in the Tegel prison (Zuchthaus Tegel (in German)) of Berlin, and later also worked in the Plötzensee Prison (very close by to the parish of Capernaum Congregation), where many prominent opponents of the Nazi regime were executed, and in the prison of Brandenburg upon Havel (Zuchthaus Brandenburg (in German)). He smuggled (last) letters and messages of many death candidates and other detainees to their relatives. Already in 1933 under the impression of the maltreatment and torture of many political inmates in Tegel he and Laukant founded a circle of opponents, helping persecuted persons to hide.

He later joined the group named Kreisauer Kreis, led by his Silesian fellow-countryman Helmuth James Graf von Moltke. After 1939 it became particular difficult to feed the hidden persons, because food was only available on official ration stamps, of course not issued to hiding persons. Moltke provided Poelchau with food from his Silesian manor estate in Kreisau, which he embezzled from the requisitions imposed by the authorities. Poelchau stored them in his basement in Afrikanische Straße # 140b and handed them out. Helping Poelchau's group Urner hid submarines in his official residence in the Paul Gerhardt Stift. In 1944 Poelchau joined a further group named Onkel Emil, promoting the fast capitulation of Germany by public graffiti on walls.

== The cemetery of Capernaum Congregation in formerly East German Ahrensfelde ==
Capernaum Congregation, located in what used to be West Berlin, has its own graveyard section in the denominational Eastern Churchyard (German: Ostkirchhof Ahrensfelde) in formerly East Berlin's eastern suburb of Ahrensfelde. Between 27 May 1952 and 3 October 1972 West Berliners were banned from free access to the East German German Democratic Republic proper – as distinguished from East Berlin. In this time all West Berliners, wishing to visit the grave of a late relative or friend in the cemeteries in East Germany, were excluded, as well as late widows and widowers, who wanted to be buried side by side with their earlier deceased spouses buried there. Between 1972 and 22 December 1989 West Berliners had restricted access, because they had to apply for East German visas and to pay for a compulsory exchange (officially in German: Mindestumtausch, i.e. minimum exchange).

== Sources ==
- Gerlinde Böpple, Kapernaum. Eine evangelische Kirchengemeinde "auf dem Wedding", Berlin: 1992.
- Matthias Donath, 100 Jahre Kapernaumkirche 1902–2002, Gemeindekirchenrat der Evangelischen Kirchengemeinden Kapernaum und Kornelius (ed.), Berlin: 2002 [flyer].
- Günther Kühne and Elisabeth Stephani, Evangelische Kirchen in Berlin (^{1}1978), Berlin: CZV-Verlag, ^{2}1986, p. 431. ISBN 3-7674-0158-4.
- Hans-Rainer Sandvoß, Widerstand in einem Arbeiterbezirk (Wedding) (^{1}1983), altered and ext. ed., Gedenkstätte Deutscher Widerstand (ed.), Berlin: Gedenkstätte Deutscher Widerstand, ^{2}1987, (Schriftenreihe über den Widerstand in Berlin von 1933 bis 1945; No. 1). ISSN 0175-3592
- Hans-Rainer Sandvoß, Widerstand in Wedding und Gesundbrunnen, Gedenkstätte Deutscher Widerstand (ed.), Berlin: Gedenkstätte Deutscher Widerstand, 2003, (Schriftenreihe über den Widerstand in Berlin von 1933 bis 1945; No. 14). ISSN 0175-3592
