= Cesvaine Parish =

Parish in Madona Municipality, Latvia

- parish of Latvia
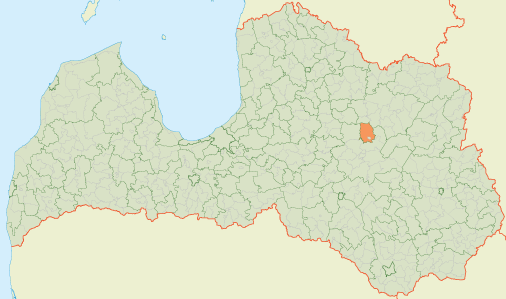
- 57°00′30″N 26°16′34″E
- Country: Latvia

Area
  - Total: 185.28 km^{2} (71.54 sq mi)
  - Land: 181.2 km^{2} (70.0 sq mi)
  - Water: 4.08 km^{2} (1.58 sq mi)

Population (1 January 2024)
  - Total: 944
  - Density: 5.1/km^{2} (13/sq mi)

Cesvaine Parish (Latvian: Cesvaines pagasts) is an administrative unit of Madona Municipality, Latvia. It was created in 2010 from the rural territory of Cesvaine town. At the beginning of 2014, the population of the parish was 1356. The administrative center of the parish is located in Cesvaine (located extraterritorially outside the parish).

From 2009 to 2021, the parish was a part of Cesvaine Municipality.

== Villages and settlements of Cesvaine parish ==
- Graši
- Kārkli
- Kārzdaba
- Kraukļi
