= Cesvaine Palace =

Palace in Cesvaine, Latvia

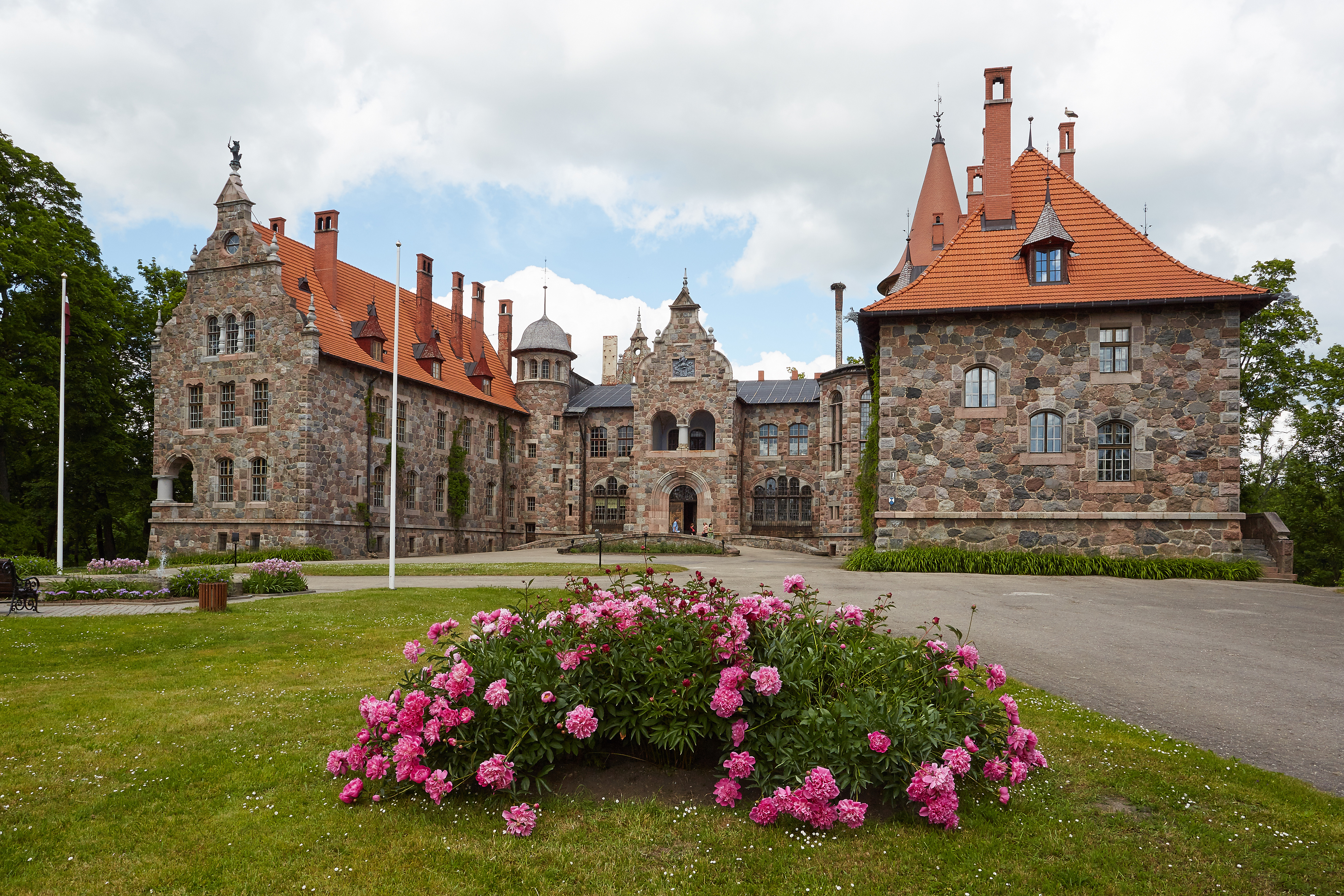

- Location within Latvia

General information
- Architectural style: Neo-Renaissance
- Location: Cesvaine, Latvia
- Coordinates: 56°51′30″N 26°13′41″E
- Completed: 1896
- Client: Adolf Gerhard von Wulf

Design and construction
- Architects: Hans Grisebach; August Dinklage

Cesvaine Palace (Latvian: Cesvaines pils; German: Schloss Seßwegen) is located in the town of Cesvaine in Madona Municipality, in the Vidzeme region of Latvia. Next to the palace lies the remains of the old bishop's castle.

== History ==
Cesvaine Palace was built in 1896 for the German baron Adolf Gerhard von Wulf (not to be confused with the von Wolf baronial family). Authors of the project were architects Hans Grisebach and August Dinklage from Berlin. The palace is built in the late Tudor Neo-Renaissance style.

At the end of the 19th century, Germany abandoned the reproduction of old German prototypes and turned to England in search of inspiration, namely to late Tudor-style architecture. The style had preserved certain Gothic elements. Picturesque frames, towers and turrets of different forms and sizes, high decorative chimneys and steep roofs were all characteristic features of the style.

Cesvaine Palace is an impressive construction representing this trend in Latvia. Abandoning forms of the German Renaissance, Griesebach created an unusual, noble and welcoming construction. It is a romantic and picturesque building, and its architecture harmonizes with the landscape. The palace is built of stone, skilfully using the colour and texture of the material. The architect has applied the principle of contrast- the facade is enriched by balconies and impressive pediments. The round tower with a helmet appears to be a successful addition. The building is renowned not only for its size and frame, but also for the quality of construction. The facades are in medieval style, creating the impression of medieval fortification.

In 1920 during Latvian land reform palace was nationalized and taken over by Ministry of Education and a Cesvaine secondary school was established. During World War 2 building was used as a headquarters of Wehrmacht. After the war palace was again used as a school. School was located in the palace until 2002.

In 2002, due to numerous fire safety regulation violations a fire broke out and destroyed the palace's roof, parts of second floor and the representative spaces in the first floor. In 2003, restoration work commenced and was finished in 2022 when the palace was once again reopened to visitors.

== See also ==
- List of palaces and manor houses in Latvia
- The Last Motor Race of The Empire Page 39
