= August Dinklage =

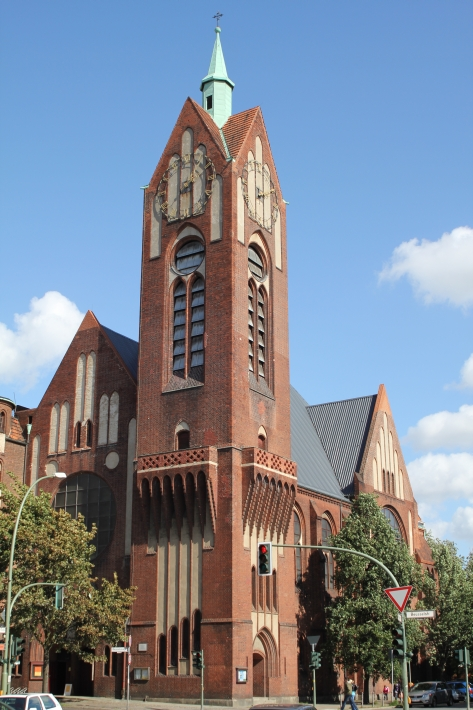
Reformation Church in Berlin-Moabit

August Georg Dinklage (3 September 1849 – 20 April 1920) was a German architect and building official.

== Life ==
August Dinklage was born in Oldenburg shortly after the conservative Grand Duchy of Oldenburg had been relatively lightly touched by the constitutional disturbances of 1848. Between 1872 and 1879 he studied at the Technische Hochschule in Hannover (now Leibniz University Hanover), where he was taught by Conrad Wilhelm Hase. He then took a government job which among other things enabled him to gain early experience of ecclesiastical buildings.

In 1889 he resigned from government service in order to pursue a career as a freelance architect, moving to Berlin where between 1889 and 1901 he was working in partnership with Hans Grisebach under the name Grisebach und Dinklage. One of their last commissions together was the neogothic Schlesisches Tor (literally "Silesian Gate") Station in Berlin-Kreuzberg which was designed primarily by Dinklage.

In 1901 Grisebach resigned from their partnership, and Dinklage took Ernst Paulus, till then an employee of the firm, as his new partner. The firm was reconfigured as Dinklage und Paulus. In 1916 it was August Dinklage, now aged 66, who retired from the partnership. During the Dinklage und Paulus years the partnership was responsible for several new churches in Berlin.

Dinklage was a member of the Slesvico-Holsatia Corps (student fraternity) in Hannover.

He died in Berlin.

== Works ==
- 1891–1893: St. John the Divine Church in Gießen (with Hans Grisebach and Richard Schultze)
- 1891–1894: St. Peter's Church in Frankfurt am Main (with Hans Grisebach)
- 1894–1896: Seßwegen Palace in Cesvaine (with Hans Grisebach)
- 1897–1898: Northern Bohemian Museum in Liberec (with Hans Grisebach)
- 1898: Klink Palace in Klink (with Hans Grisebach)
- 1900–1901: Silesian Gate Station in Berlin (with Hans Grisebach)
- 1904: Martha Church in Berlin (with Ernst Paulus)
- 1905–1906: Holy Ghost Church in Moabit, Berlin (with Ernst Paulus)
- 1905–1907: Reformation Church in Berlin (with Ernst Paulus, based on designs by Ernst Schwartzkopff)
- 1908: Church of the Blessing in Prenzlauer Berg, Berlin (with Ernst Paulus and Olaf Lilloe)
- 1909–1910: Galilee Church in Berlin (with Ernst Paulus)
- 1909–1912: Redeemer Church in Moabit, Berlin (with Ernst Paulus and Olaf Lilloe)
- 1910: Advent Church in Berlin (with Ernst Paulus)
- 1911: Easter Church in Berlin (with Ernst Paulus and Olaf Lilloe)
