= Rūsiņš Mārtiņš Freivalds =

Latvian computer scientist and mathematician (1942–2016)

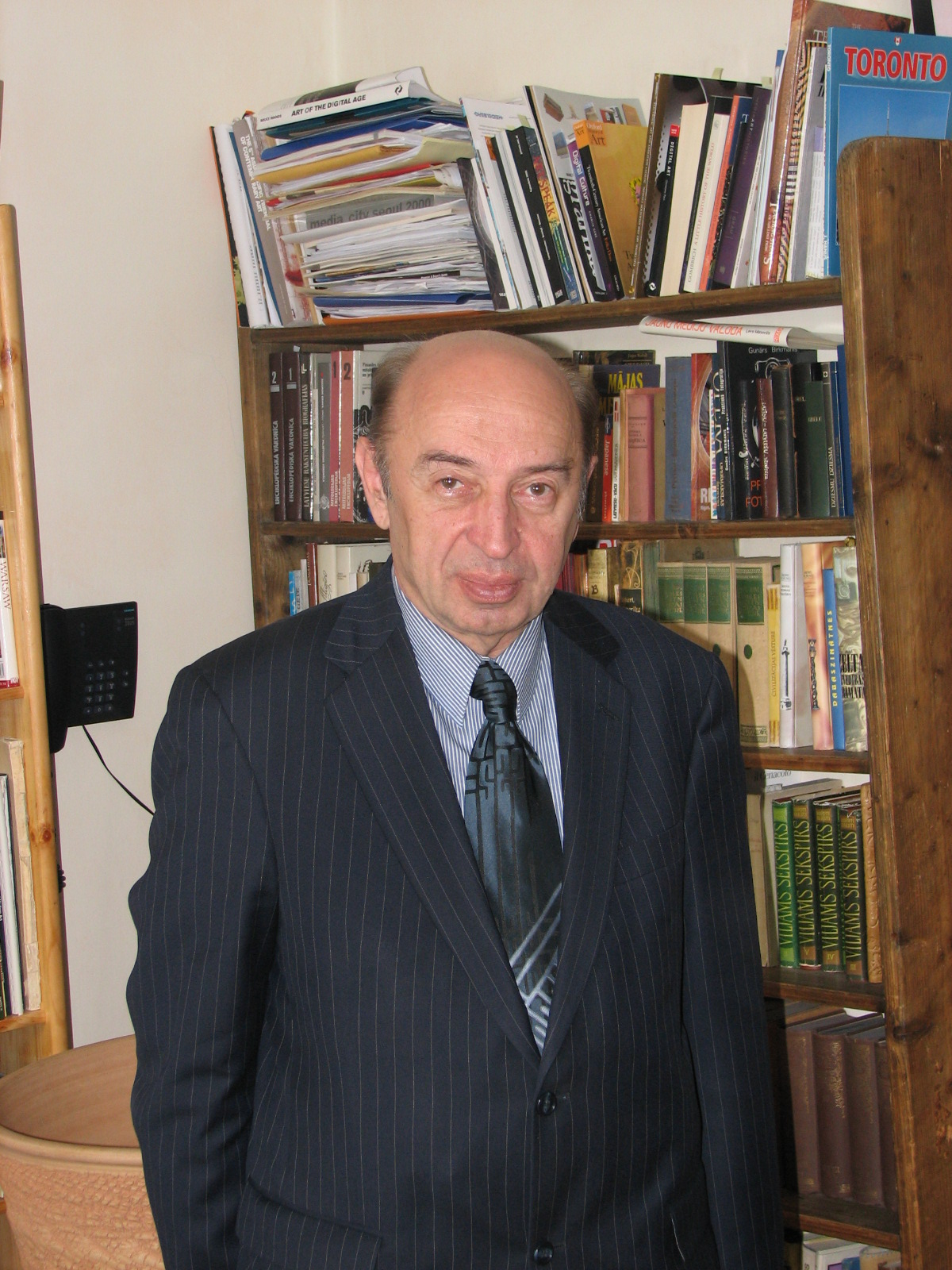
- Freivalds in June 2009
- Born: 10 November 1942; Cesvaine, German‑occupied Latvia
- Died: 4 January 2016 (aged 73); Riga, Latvia
- Education: University of Latvia
- Known for: Freivalds' algorithm, ultrametric algorithms
- Awards: Grand Medal of the Latvian Academy of Sciences, Academia Europaea
- Scientific career
- Fields: Theoretical computer science, quantum computing
- Workplaces: University of Latvia
- Doctoral advisor: Boris Trakhtenbrot

Rūsiņš Mārtiņš Freivalds (10 November 1942 – 4 January 2016) was a Latvian computer scientist and mathematician. He was celebrated for founding ultrametric algorithms and for fundamental contributions to the theory of computation, probabilistic algorithms, inductive inference, and quantum computing. He is best known for Freivalds' algorithm, a simple randomized procedure to check matrix multiplication in less time than recomputing it. He was a member of the Latvian Academy of Sciences from 1992. He also taught at the University of Latvia, with students including Daina Taimiņa and Andris Ambainis. He was born in Cesvaine and studied at Moscow State University (MSU).

== Early life and education ==
Freivalds was born in Cesvaine, then under German occupation, and grew up in the Latvian Soviet Socialist Republic. He studied physics and mathematics at the Peteris Stučka Latvian State University, graduating in 1965 at its Faculty of Physics and Mathematics.

== Academic career ==
Freivalds earned his Candidate of Sciences (Dr math.) in 1972 with a thesis supervised by Boris Trakhtenbrot at Akademgorodok, Novosibirsk, where he and fellow Latvian Jānis Bārzdiņš helped build one of the Soviet Union's leading theoretical computer science centres. Returning to Riga later that year, he headed the laboratory at the University of Latvia Computing Centre from 1975 to 1985 and, together with Bārzdiņš, founded the university's school of theoretical computer science—a tradition whose faculty largely comprise their academic descendants. In 1985 he earned his Doctor of Science (Dr habil. math.) at Moscow State University and was promoted to full professor. He subsequently held visiting positions at Hokkaido University, Cornell University, the National University of Singapore, Mälardalens University and Humboldt University of Berlin.

== Research contributions ==
Freivalds' work unified classical mathematics with emerging problems in computer science. In 1977 he introduced what is now called Freivalds' algorithm, a probabilistic method that verifies the product of two matrices by checking a random linear combination rather than performing full multiplication. By showing that a single random test fails with low probability, it reduces the time needed to confirm correctness, and is taught in standard algorithm courses worldwide.

Building on the Latvian school of inductive inference, Freivalds studied the number of mind changes required for learning recursive functions. His work with Jānis Bārzdiņš on the “halving algorithm” demonstrated early probabilistic strategies in formal learning and influenced later on‑line learning models.

In the early 1990s he extended his interest into quantum computing, mentoring Andris Ambainis towards the field. In 2012 he invented ultrametric algorithms, which use p-adic number amplitudes—an alternative number system—to model computation probabilistically. His 2014 paper "Active Learning of Recursive Functions by Ultrametric Algorithms" demonstrated that these methods can outperform nondeterministic ones on certain problems.

Freivalds' work on inductive inference was first recognised in 1976 with the Latvian YCL Prize for Theory of Inductive Inference. A decade later, in 1986, he was named an Honorary Scientist of the Latvian SSR. In 1992 he was elected a Corresponding Member of the Latvian Academy of Sciences and became a full Member later that same year. His achievements in probabilistic and ultrametric algorithms earned him three of Latvia's highest distinctions in 2003: the Grand Medal of the Latvian Academy of Sciences, the joint Latvian Academy of Sciences & Joint‑Stock Company "Grindex" Prize, and the Eizens Arņš Prize for Effective Probable Algorithms. In 2006, University of Latvia students voted him "Teacher of the Year" for the natural sciences, and in 2010 he was elected to the Academia Europaea.

== Personal life and legacy ==
Freivalds had a reputation as an inspiring teacher, known for guiding undergraduates into research, and for his rigorous yet accessible style. His legacy includes a generation of Latvian computer scientists tracing their academic lineage to him. He continued writing pedagogical texts and worked on educational programmes in informatics until his sudden death from a heart attack in Riga in January 2016, aged 73. He is commemorated in popular science outlets such as Zvaigžnota Debess.
