= Agnes-Marie Grisebach =

German actor and writer (1913–2011)

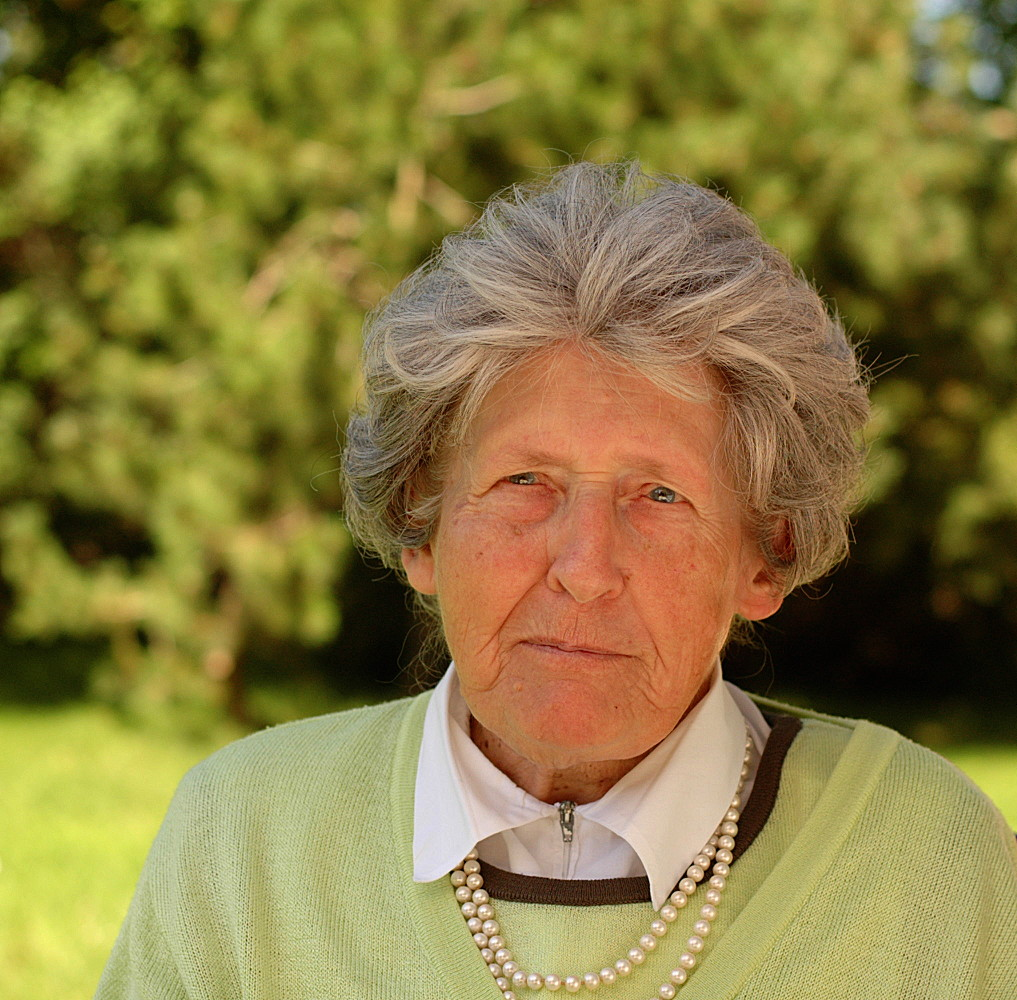
- Agnes-Marie Grisebach in 2005
- Born: 2 September 1913; Berlin, Germany
- Died: 6 March 2011 (aged 97); Ahrenshoop, Germany
- Occupations: Actor and writer

Agnes-Marie Grisebach (2 September 1913, in Berlin — 6 March 2011 in Ahrenshoop) was a German actor and writer. Her real name was Agnes Eggert, but she published under her birth name.

== Life ==
Grisebach spent her childhood in Berlin and in the Baltic seaside resort Ahrenshoop. She became an actress and worked in Munich and Breslau at the theater. In 1936, she married the director Walter Eggert in 1936 and lived as a mother and housewife in Rostock and Ahrenshoop. In 1942 she was evacuated to the Zingst peninsula (Baltic Sea).

After her divorce, she was the sole breadwinner and brought herself and her four children, including Almut Eggert, through the difficult post-war years and finally lived in Rostock again. At the end of 1951, she fled to the West with her children and worked in a brake factory in Heidelberg until 1973. From 1976 she lived in Frankfurt am Main and in Neu-Isenburg. From 1996 until her death, she lived in the Ahrenshoop house again, which had been built by her father Helmuth Grisebach (1883–1970).

It was not until she was 75 that she published her first book Eine Frau Jahrgang 13, which hit the bestseller lists shortly after its publication and was later also published in paperback. The book recalled the fate of the Trümmerfrauen and made many people aware of how little literature, autobiographies or other Zeitzeugen-Berichten from those years existed. Her second novel A Woman in the West. Roman eines Neuanfangs (1989) tells how her life continued.

She told her eventful life story, which is typical of a whole generation of women who took their lives into their own hands, in her three-part autobiography: Eine Frau Jahrgang 13, Eine Frau im Westen, Von Anfang zu Anfang.

Even when she went blind in 1995, she still published another novel and a volume of poetry (Von Anfang zu Anfang and Kämmerchen für die Musen).

In 1990, Grisebach was awarded the Neu-Isenburg town's culture prize "in appreciation of her literary achievements and in recognition of her cultural services to the town".

On March 6, 2011, Agnes-Marie Grisebach died in Ahrenshoop at the age of 97.

== Works ==
- Eine Frau Jahrgang 13. Roman einer unfreiwilligen Emanzipation. 7th ed. Fischer-Taschenbuch-Verlag, Frankfurt/M. 2005, ISBN 3-596-14687-9.
- Eine Frau im Westen. Novel of a new beginning. Fischer-Taschenbuch-Verlag, Frankfurt/M. 1992, ISBN 3-596-10467-X.
- Das verbotene Kind. Scheunen-Verlag, Kückenshagen 2005, ISBN 3-938398-10-8 (former title: Abschied am Hohen Ufer).
- Die Dame mit dem Schleierhütchen. Tales. New edition. Rowohlt, Reinbek 2005, ISBN 3-499-33218-3.
- Frauen im Korsett. Two unmarried bourgeois daughters in the 19th century. Fischer-Taschenbuch-Verlag, Frankfurt/M. 1995, ISBN 3-596-13450-1.
- Von Anfang zu Anfang. Eine Frau Jahrgang 13 erzählt vom Ende des letzten Jahrhunderts. Fischer-Taschenbuch-Verlag, Frankfurt/M., 2003, ISBN 3-596-15991-1.
- Kämmerchen für die Musen. Bülten-Verlag, Kückenshagen 2005, ISBN 3-938510-01-3.
