= Cesvaine =

Town in Madona Municipality, Latvia

- Town
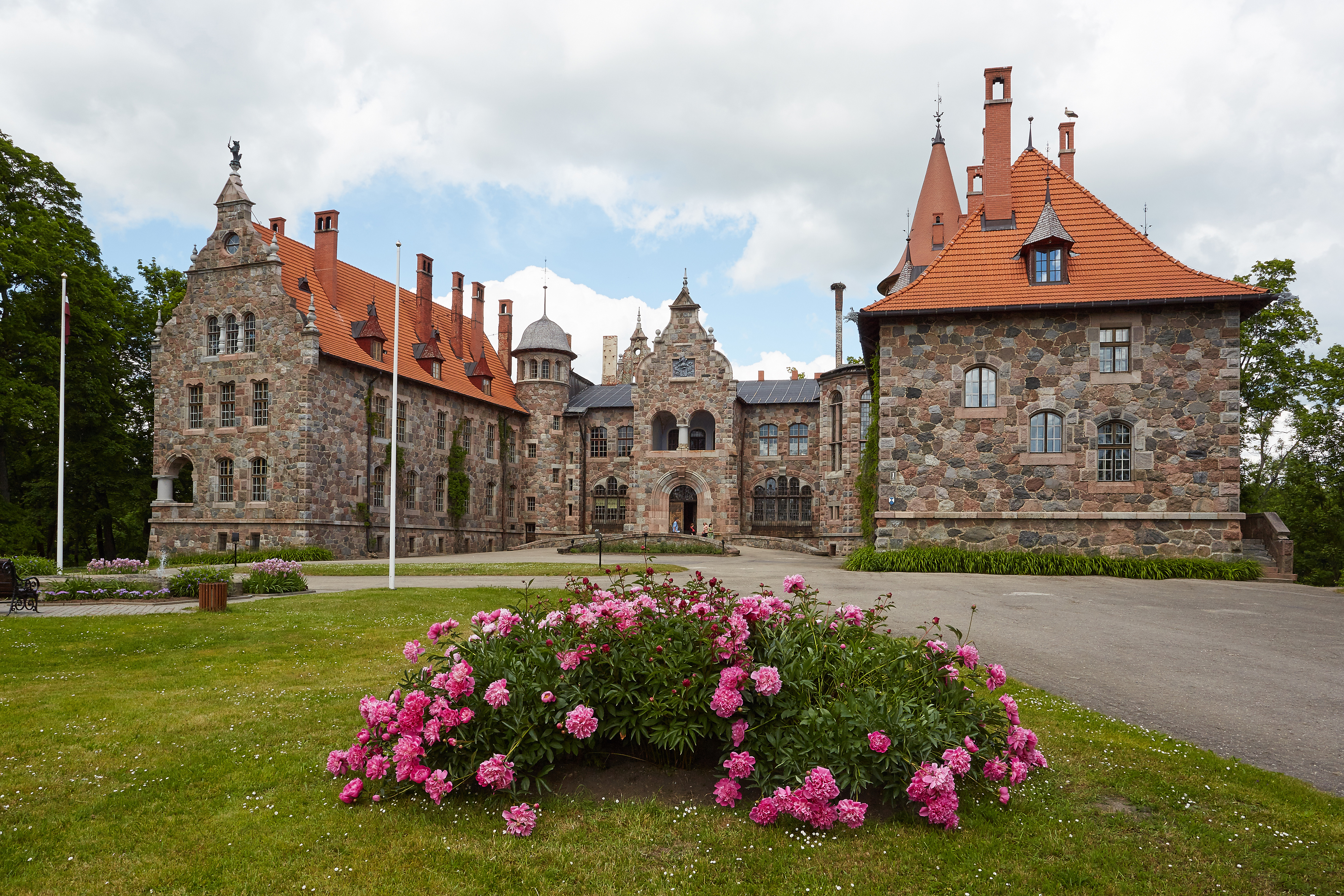
- Cesvaine Palace

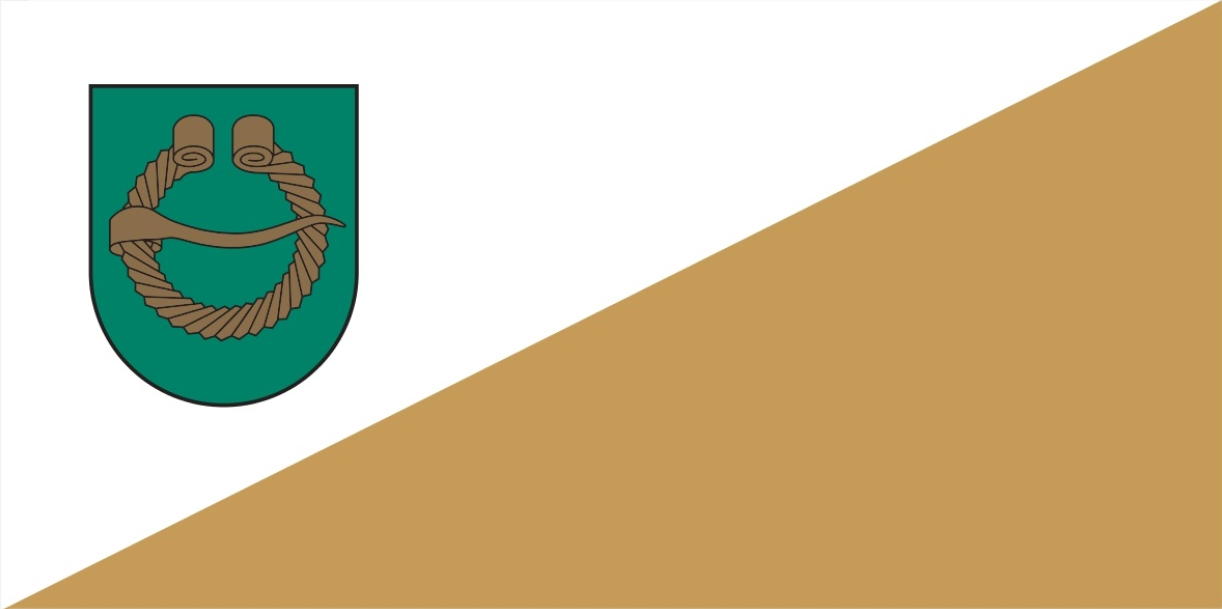
- Flag Coat of arms

- Location in Latvia
- Coordinates: 56°58′N 26°19′E
- Country: Latvia
- Municipality: Madona
- Town rights: 1991

Government
  - Mayor: Vilnis Špats

Area
  - Total: 5.09 km^{2} (1.97 sq mi)
  - Land: 4.99 km^{2} (1.93 sq mi)
  - Water: 0.1 km^{2} (0.039 sq mi)
  - Rural territory: 180.4 km^{2} (69.7 sq mi)

Population (2026)
  - Total: 1,163
  - Density: 233/km^{2} (604/sq mi)
- Time zone: UTC+2 (EET)
  - Summer (DST): UTC+3 (EEST)
- Postal code: LV-4871
- Calling code: +371 648
- Number of city council members: 9
- Website: www.cesvaine.lv

Cesvaine (German: Seßwegen) is a town in Madona Municipality, Vidzeme Region, Latvia. It is home to the Cesvaine Palace, built in 1896 near the ruins of previous medieval castles. The town is also the extra-territorial center of Cesvaine Parish, of which the town is not a part of.

== History ==
During the period before the Livonian Crusade in the 13th century, the territory of modern Cesvaine was part of the Principality of Jersika and was inhabited by ancient Latgalians. It was first mentioned in written sources in 1209 (Latin: Urbs Zcessowe) in the treaty between bishop Albert of Riga and Visvaldis of Jersika. In 1211 the Bishopric of Riga and the Livonian Brothers of Sword partitioned the lands of Jersika between themselves. The territory of Cesvaine fell under the control of the Livonian Brothers of the Sword, however in 1213 some of the lands were exchanged and Cesvaine became property of the Bishop of Riga.

In the beginning of the 15th century, a stone castle was built in Cesvaine and the settlement started to grow. By the end of the 16th century there were already 80 houses in Cesvaine. During the Livonian War in 1577, defenders of Cesvaine castle refused to surrender. Consequently, the Russian tsar Ivan the Terrible ordered that the castle and whole town be destroyed. After the war in 1582 Cesvaine became part of Duchy of Livonia.

In 1656 during the Second Northern War Russians again seized the castle and destroyed the town.

A new period in the history of Cesvaine started in the year 1815 when the settlement and nearby lands were bought by the baron von Wulf. Cesvaine became centre of the manor and rapid development started in the second half of the 19th century.

In 1932 Cesvaine became a village in the Republic of Latvia. It was granted town rights in 1991. From 2009 to 2021, the town was the administrative centre of Cesvaine Municipality, until it was merged into Madona Municipality.

== Notable people ==
- Jakob Lenz (1751–1792), a Baltic German writer of the Sturm und Drang movement.
- Igor Zhdanov (1920 – 1996), a Latvian/Soviet chess master, won the Latvian Chess Championship in 1943.
- Rūsiņš Mārtiņš Freivalds (1942 – 2016), computer scientist and mathematician, founded ultrametric algorithms

== Twin towns — sister cities ==
Cesvaine is twinned with:

- Coulaines, France
- Dnipropetrovsk Oblast, Ukraine
- Lagardelle-sur-Lèze, France
- Märjamaa, Estonia
- Volkhov, Russia
- Weyhe, Germany

== Gallery ==
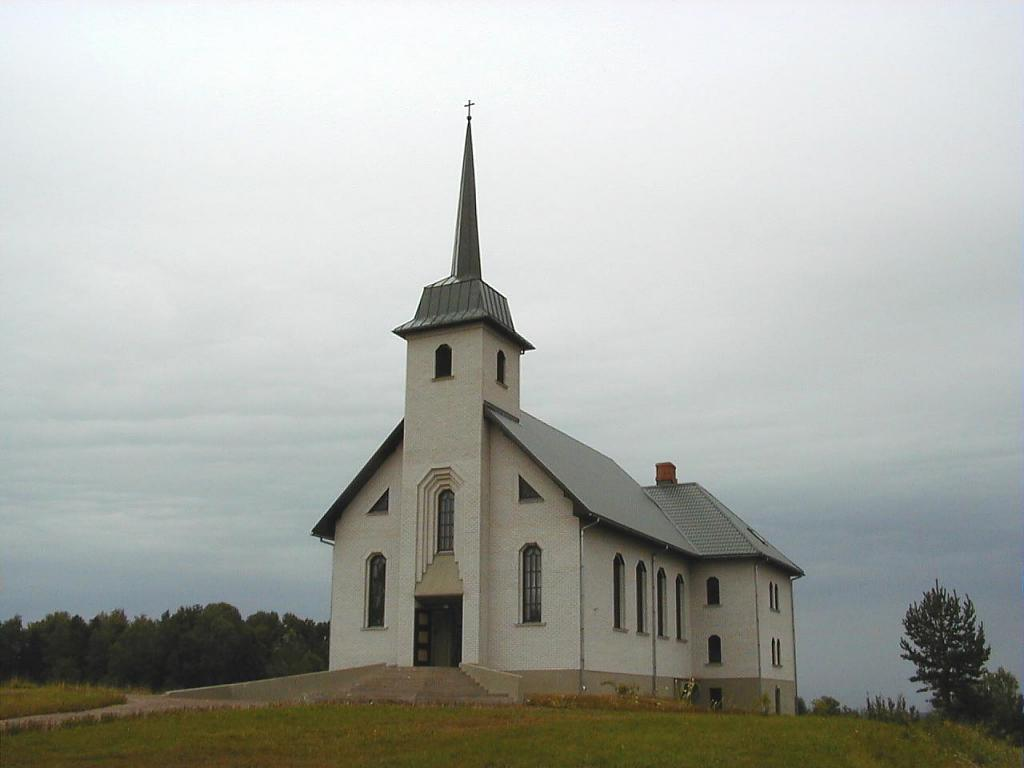
Roman Catholic church in Cesvaine

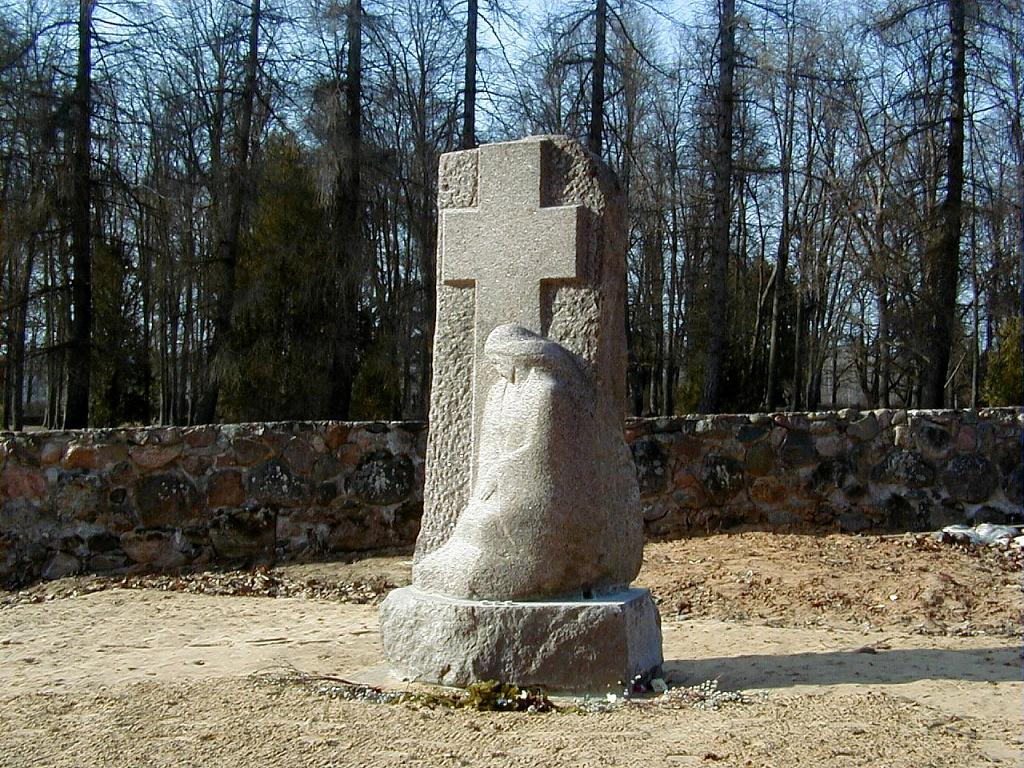
Monument to victims of Soviet repressions in Cesvaine

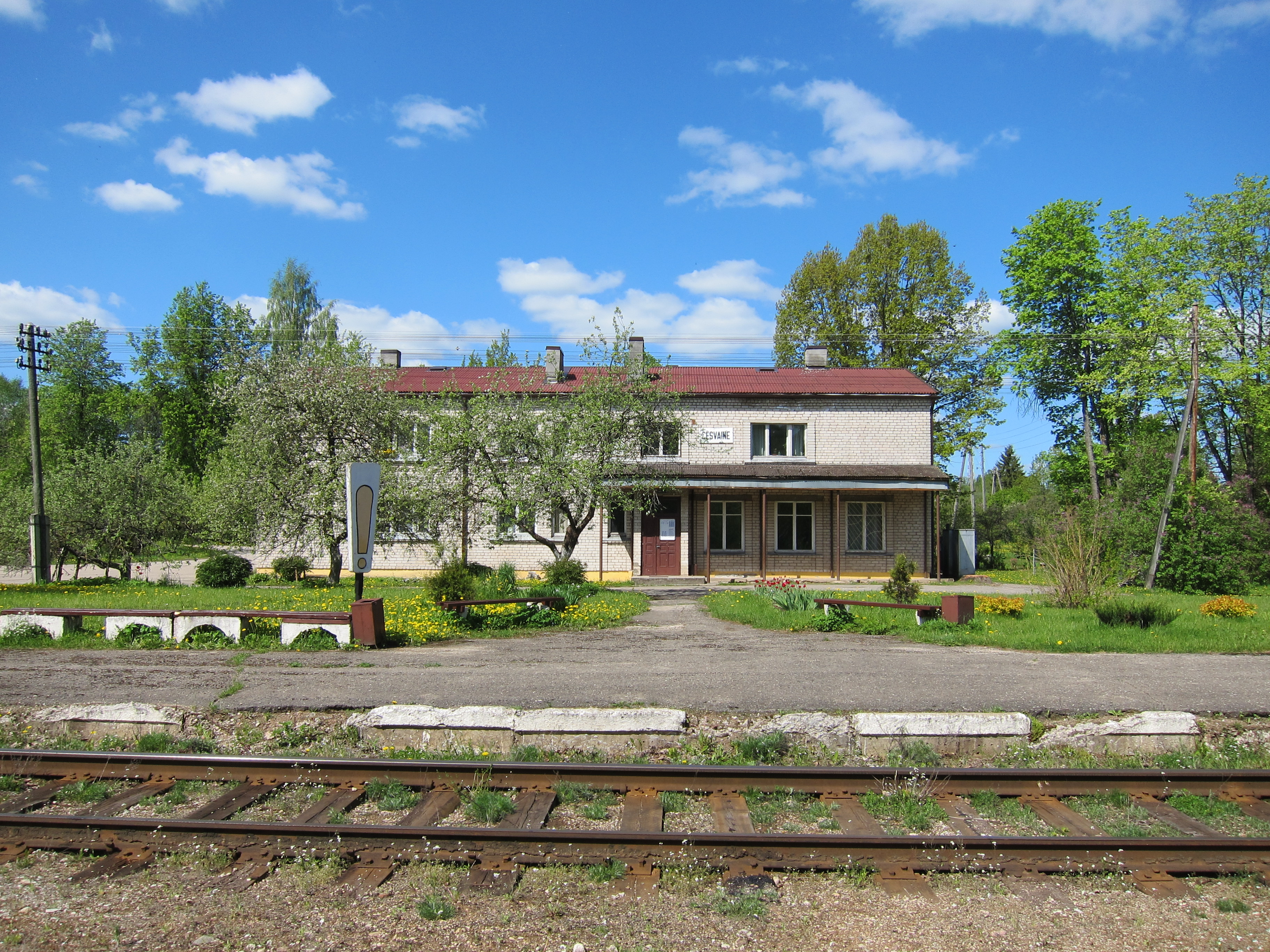
Cesvaine railway station

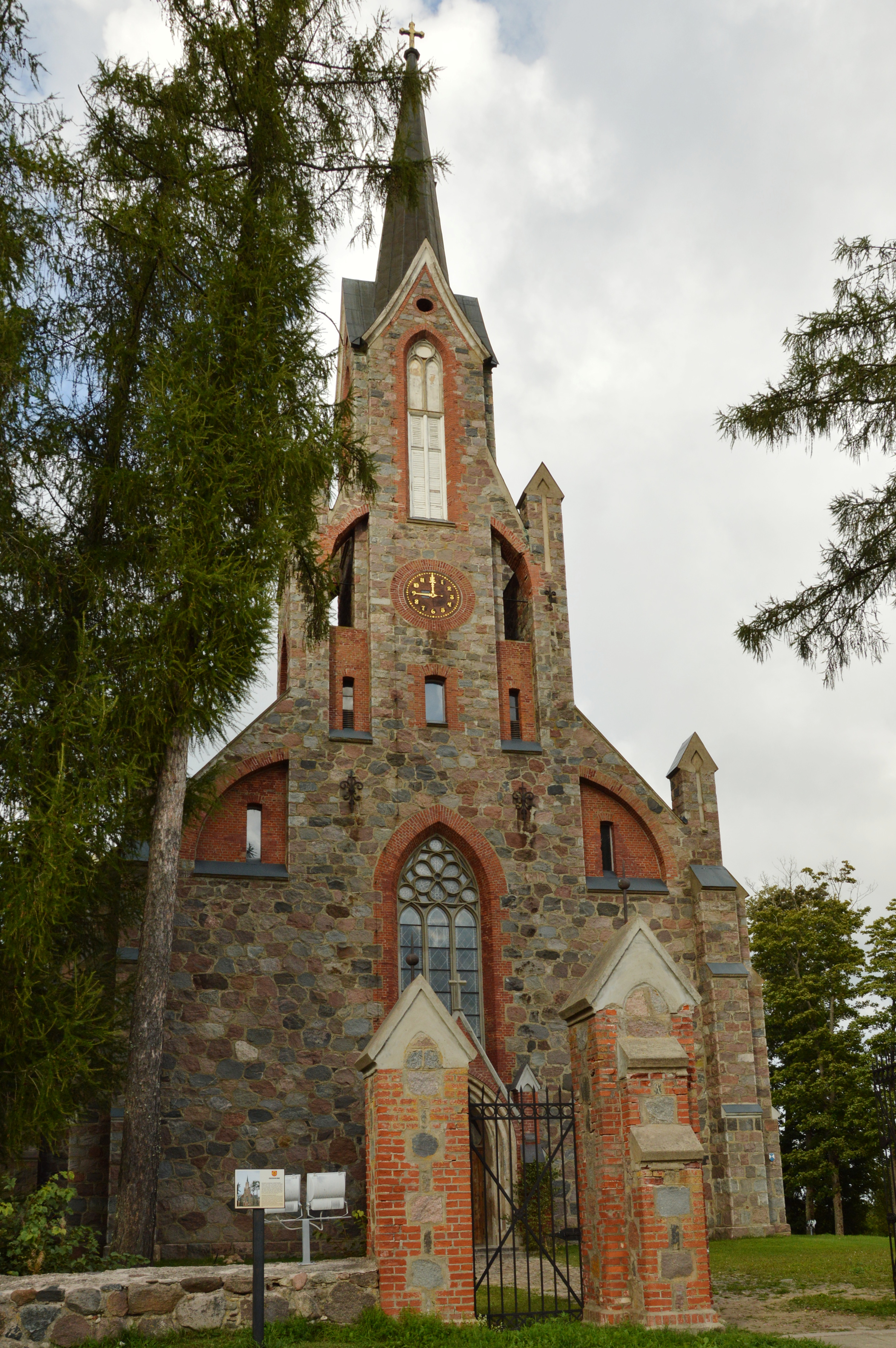
Cesvaine lutheran church

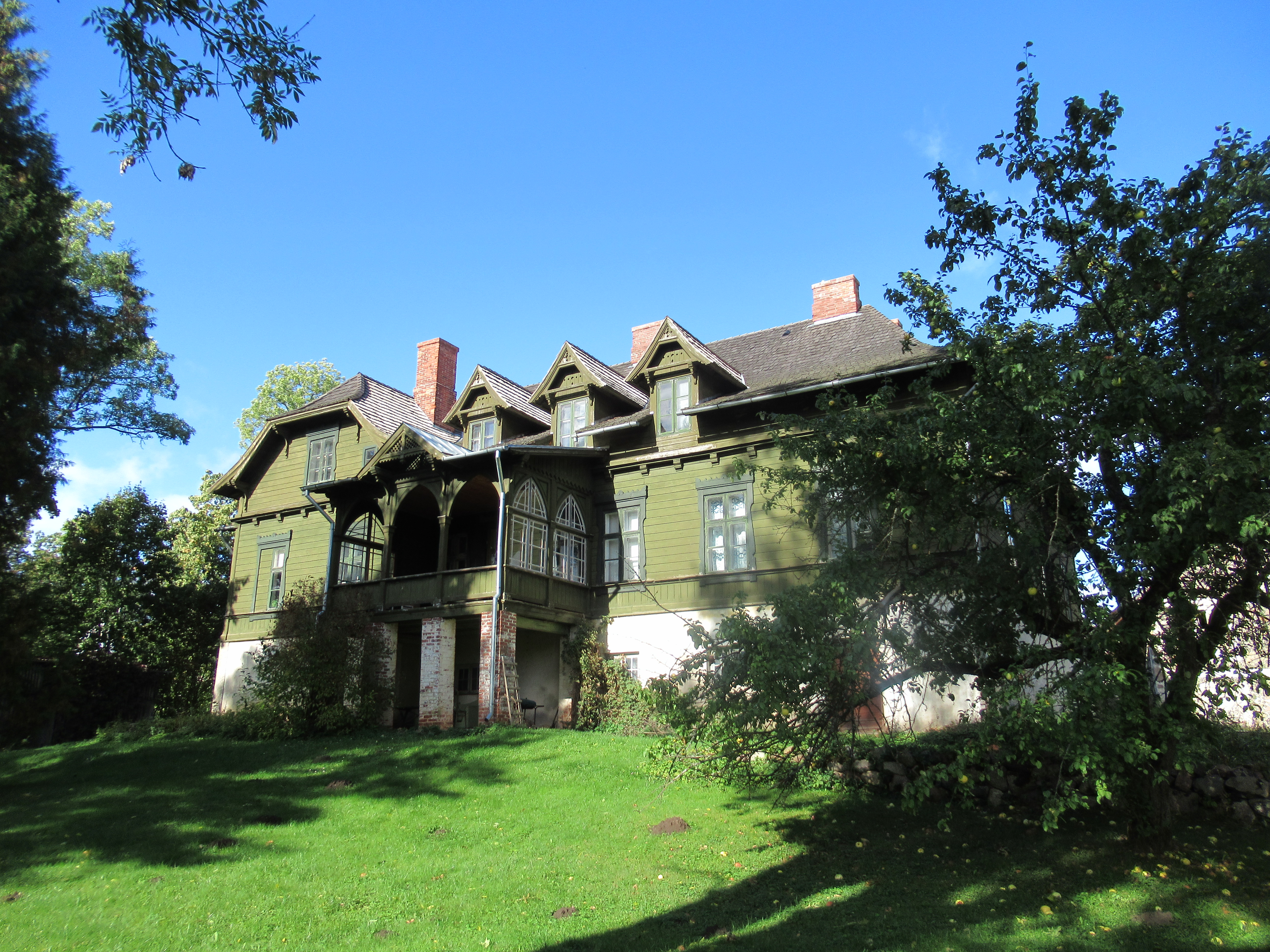
House of the former manorial forester.

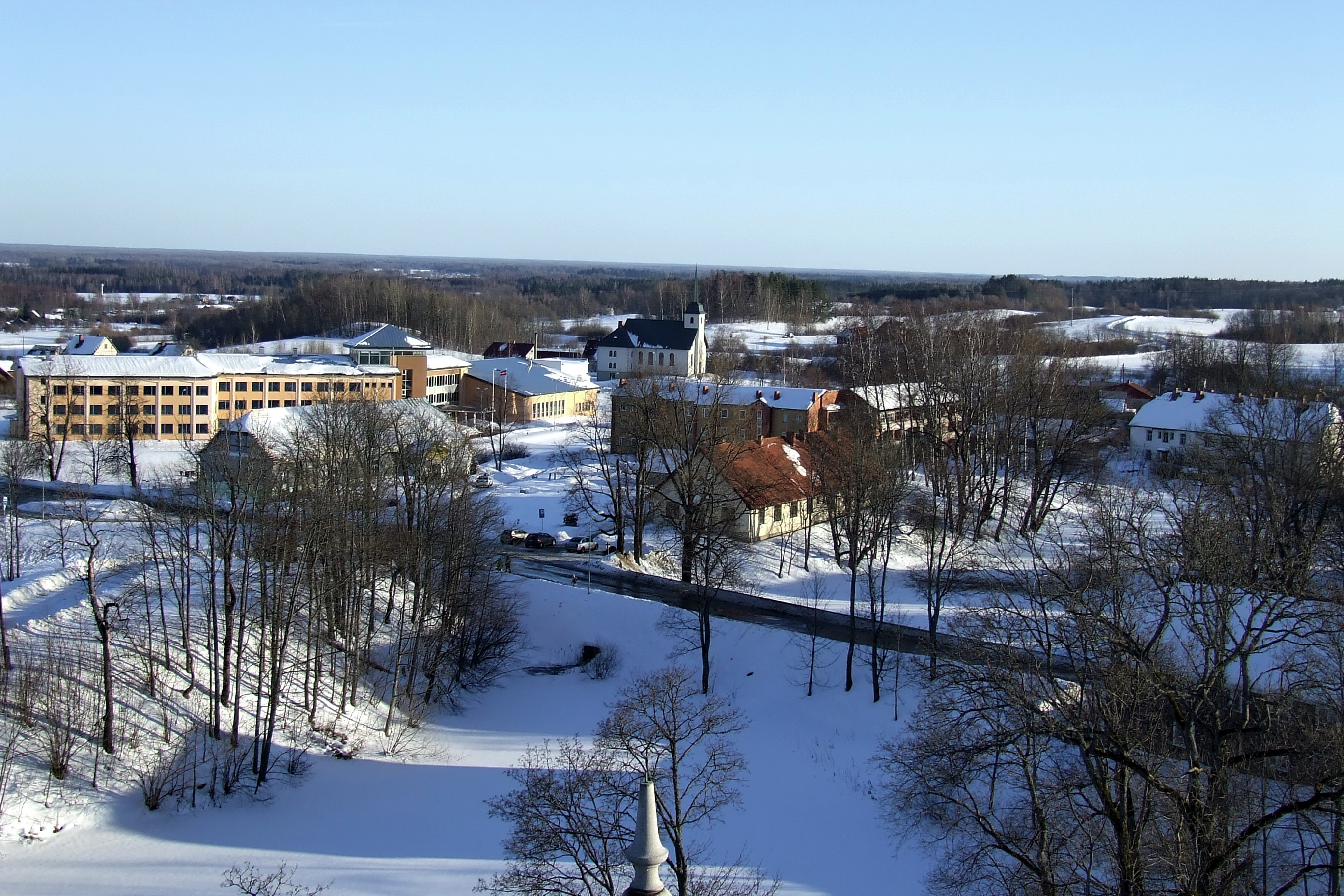
View of Cesvaine

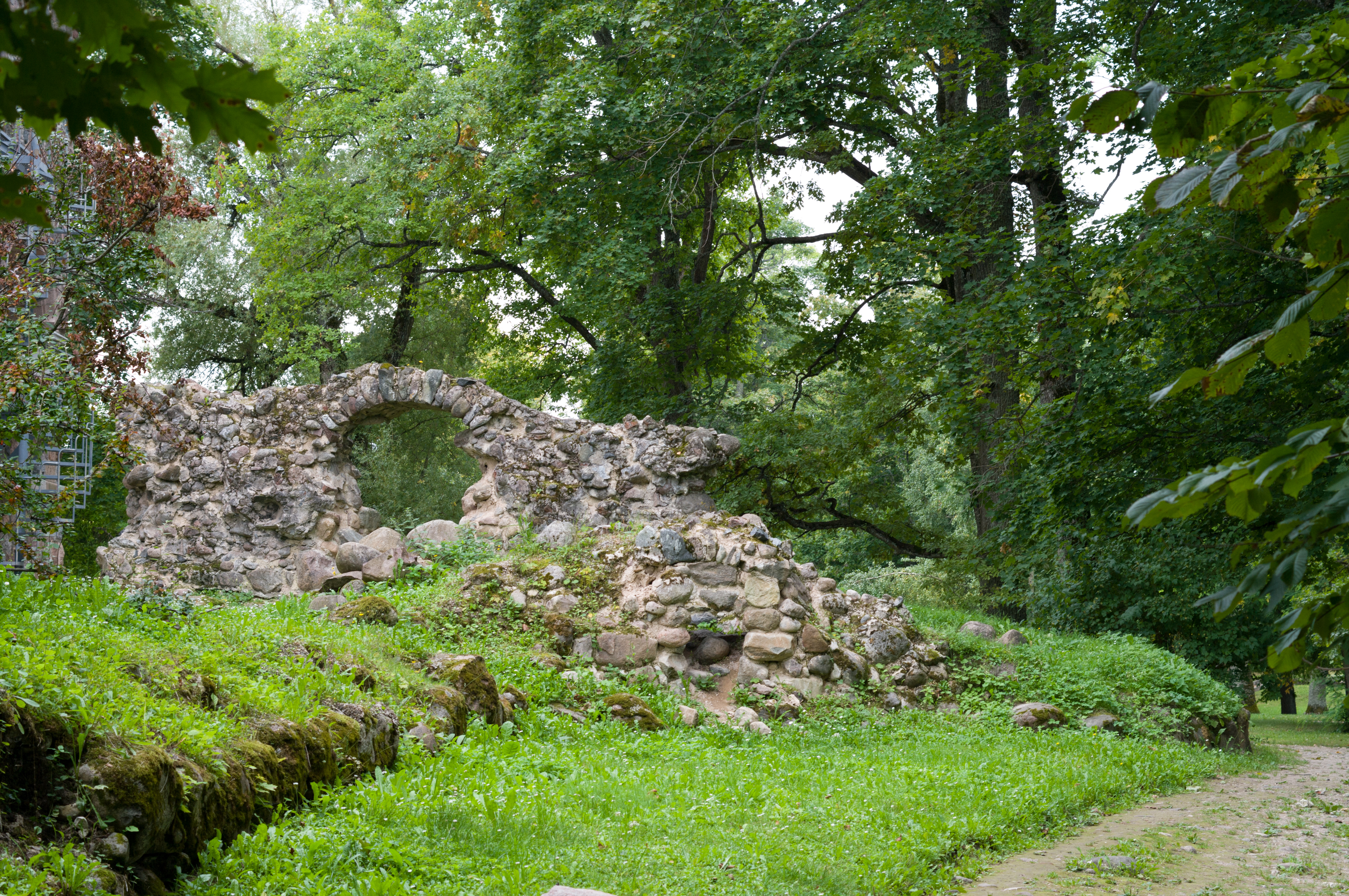
Remnants of medieval castle in Cesvaine park.

== See also ==
- List of cities in Latvia
