= Tyszkiewicz =

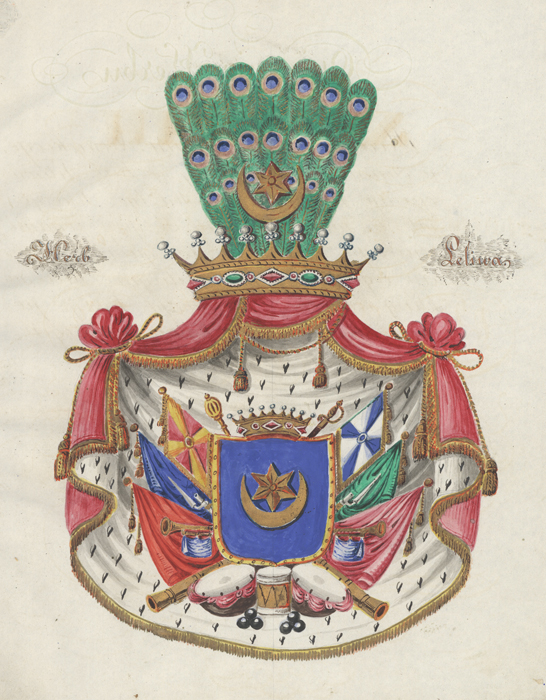
Coat of arms of Counts Tyszkiewicz

Tyszkiewicz is the name of the Tyszkiewicz family, a Polish–Lithuanian magnate noble family of Ruthenian origin. The Lithuanian equivalent is Tiškevičius; it is frequently transliterated from Russian and Belarusian as Tyshkevich.

Other people with the name include:

- Beata Tyszkiewicz (born 1938), Polish actress
- Eustachy Tyszkiewicz (1814–1874), Polish antiquarian and museum founder
- Iwan Tyszkiewicz (died 1611), Polish-Lithuanian Socinian executed as a blasphemer and heretic
- Piotr Tyszkiewicz (born 1970), Polish footballer
- Robert Tyszkiewicz (born 1963), Polish politician
- Stefan Tyszkiewicz (1894–1976), Polish-Lithuanian landowner, engineer and inventor

People named Tyshkevich include:

- Regina Tyshkevich (1929–2019), Belarusian mathematician, professor
- Tamara Tyshkevich (1931–1997), Soviet Union shot put athlete
