= Václav Havel (disambiguation) =

Václav Havel was the first President of the Czech Republic.

Václav Havel may also refer to:

- Václav Havel (canoeist), Olympic canoe medallist for Czechoslovakia
- V. J. Havel (Václav J. Havel), a Czech mathematician
- Václav Maria Havel, businessman and father of Václav Havel
