= Splittance =

Distance of a graph from a split graph

Two graphs with splittance 0 and 2, respectively. The first is therefore a split graph, and the second would need the solid red edge removed and the dashed red edge added to become a split graph.

In graph theory, a branch of mathematics, the splittance of an undirected graph measures its distance from a split graph. A split graph is a graph whose vertices can be partitioned into an independent set (with no edges within this subset) and a clique (having all possible edges within this subset). The splittance is the smallest number of edge additions and removals that transform the given graph into a split graph.

== Calculation from degree sequence ==
The splittance of a graph can be calculated only from the degree sequence of the graph, without examining the detailed structure of the graph. Let G be any graph with n vertices, whose degrees in decreasing order are d_{1} ≥ d_{2} ≥ d_{3} ≥ … ≥ d_{n}. Let m be the largest index for which d_{i} ≥ i – 1. Then the splittance of G is

$$\sigma(G)=\tbinom{m}{2}-\frac12\sum_{i=1}^m d_i +\frac12\sum_{i=m+1}^n d_i.$$

The given graph is a split graph already if σ(G) = 0. Otherwise, it can be made into a split graph by calculating m, adding all missing edges between pairs of the m vertices of maximum degree, and removing all edges between pairs of the remaining vertices. As a consequence, the splittance and a sequence of edge additions and removals that realize it can be computed in linear time.

== Applications ==
The splittance of a graph has been used in parameterized complexity as a parameter to describe the efficiency of algorithms. For instance, graph coloring is fixed-parameter tractable under this parameter: it is possible to optimally color the graphs of bounded splittance in linear time.
