= V. J. Havel =

Czech mathematician

Václav Jaromír Havel (1927-2022) was a Czech mathematician. He is known for characterizing the degree sequences of undirected graphs and the Havel–Hakimi algorithm. It is an important contribution to graph theory.

== Selected publications ==
- Havel, Václav (1955), "A remark on the existence of finite graphs", Časopis pro pěstování matematiky (in Czech), 80 (4): 477–480, doi:10.21136/CPM.1955.108220
