= Regina Tyshkevich =

Belarusian mathematician (1929–2019)

- Born: Regina Iosifovna Tyshkevich; October 29, 1929; Minsk, SFSR, Soviet Union
- Died: November 17, 2019 (aged 90)
- Education: Belarusian State University
- Scientific career
- Fields: Mathematics
- Workplaces: Belarusian State University

Regina Iosifovna Tyshkevich (Belarusian: Рэгіна Іосіфаўна Тышкевіч; 20 October 1929 – 17 November 2019) was a Belarusian mathematician, an expert in graph theory, Doctor of Physical and Mathematical Sciences, professor of the Belarusian State University.

Her main scientific interests included Intersection graphs, degree sequences, and the reconstruction conjecture. She was also known for an independent introduction and investigation of the class of split graphs and for her contributions to line graphs of hypergraphs.

In 1998, she was awarded the Belarus State Prize for her book Lectures in Graph Theory. Of note is her textbook An Introduction into Mathematics, written together with her two colleagues.

In October 2009 an international conference "Discrete Mathematics, Algebra, and their Applications", sponsored by the Central European Initiative, was held in Minsk, Belarus in honor of her 80th anniversary.

Regina Tyshkevich was a direct descendant of the Tyszkiewicz magnate family, therefore her colleagues sometimes called her "the countess of graph theory", which is a pun in the Russian language: the Russian word "граф" (graf) is a homonym for two words meaning "count" and "graph".

== Books and selected publications ==
- (With Dmitry Suprunenko) "Commutative Matrices", 1968, Academic Press ISBN 0-12-677050-6
  - Russian original: "Perestanovochnye matritsy" 1966, 2nd edition: 2003, ISBN 5-354-00437-3
- (With Emilichev, V. A., Melnikov, O. I., Sarvanov, V. I.) "Lectures on Graph Theory", B. I. Wissenschaftsverlag, 1994 ISBN 3-411-17121-9
  - Russian original: "Lektsii po teorii grafov", 1990
- (With O. Melnikov and V. Sarvanov, etc.) "Exercises in Graph Theory", Kluwer Academic Publishers, 1998, ISBN 0-7923-4906-7
- "Linear Algebra and Analytical Geometry (Линейная алгебра и аналитическая геометрия)
- Кононов С.Г., Тышкевич Р.И., Янчевский В.И. "Введение в математику" ("An Introduction into Mathematics") 3 volumes, Minsk, Belarusian State University, 2003
- R.I. Tyshkevich. Decomposition of graphical sequences and unigraphs // Discrete Math., 2000, Vol. 220, p. 201 - 238.
- Yury Metelsky, Regina Tyshkevich: Line Graphs of Helly Hypergraphs. SIAM Journal on Discrete Mathematics 16(3): 438-448 (2003)

== State awards ==
- 1979 (Почетная грамота Министерства высшего и среднего образования БССР «За многолетнюю плодотворную научно-методическую деятельность»);
- 1985: Veteran of Labor Medal (Медаль «Ветеран труда»);
- 1992: (почетное звание «Заслуженный работник народного образования Республики Беларусь»)
- 1998: Belarus State Prize (государственная премия Республики Беларусь);
- 2009: Medal of Francysk Skaryna
