= Victor Pan =

Soviet American mathematician

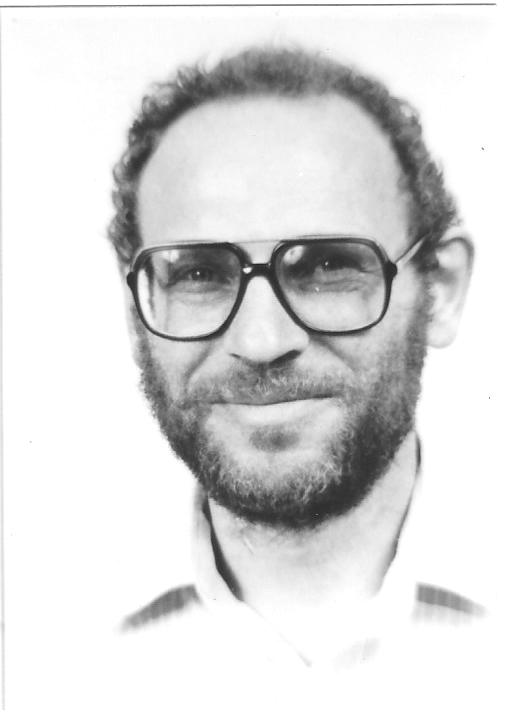
Victor Pan in 1996

Victor Yakovlevich Pan (Russian: Пан Виктор Яковлевич) is a Soviet and American mathematician and computer scientist, known for his research on algorithms for polynomials and matrix multiplication.

== Education and career ==
Pan earned his Ph.D. at Moscow University in 1964, under the supervision of Anatoli Georgievich Vitushkin, and continued his work at the Soviet Academy of Sciences. During that time, he published a number of significant papers and became known informally as "polynomial Pan" for his pioneering work in the area of polynomial computations. In late 1970s, he immigrated to the United States and held positions at several institutions including IBM Research. Since 1988, he has taught at Lehman College of the City University of New York.

== Contributions ==
Victor Pan is an expert in computational complexity and has developed a number of new algorithms. One of his notable early results is a proof that the number of multiplications in Horner's method is optimal.^{[CVP]}

In the theory of matrix multiplication algorithms, Pan in 1978 published an algorithm with running time $O(n^{2.795})$. This was the first improvement over the Strassen algorithm after nearly a decade, and kicked off a long line of improvements in fast matrix multiplication that later included the Coppersmith–Winograd algorithm and subsequent developments.^{[SNO]} He wrote the text How to Multiply Matrices Faster (Springer, 1984) surveying early developments in this area.^{[HMM]} His 1982 algorithm^{[P82]} still held the record in 2020 for the fastest "practically useful" matrix multiplication algorithm (i.e., with a small base size and manageable hidden constants). In 1998, with his student Xiaohan Huang, Pan showed that matrix multiplication algorithms can take advantage of rectangular matrices with unbalanced aspect ratios, multiplying them more quickly than the time bounds one would obtain using square matrix multiplication algorithms.^{[FRM]}

Since that work, Pan has returned to symbolic and numeric computation and to an earlier theme of his research, computations with polynomials. He developed fast algorithms for the numerical computation of polynomial roots,^{[UP]} and, with Bernard Mourrain, algorithms for multivariate polynomials based on their relations to structured matrices.^{[MPD]} He also authored or co-authored several more books, on matrix and polynomial computation,^{[PMC]} structured matrices,^{[SMP]} and on numerical root-finding procedures.^{[NMR]}

== Recognition ==
Pan was appointed Distinguished Professor at Lehman College in 2000.

In 2013 he became a fellow of the American Mathematical Society, for "contributions to the mathematical theory of computation".

== Selected publications ==
=== Research papers ===
CVP.	Pan, V. Ja. (1966), "On means of calculating values of polynomials", Russian Math. Surveys, 21: 105–136, doi:10.1070/rm1966v021n01abeh004147, MR 0207178, S2CID 250869179

SNO.	Pan, V. Ya. (October 1978), "Strassen's algorithm is not optimal: Trilinear technique of aggregating, uniting and canceling for constructing fast algorithms for matrix operations", Proceedings of the 19th Annual Symposium on Foundations of Computer Science (FOCS 1978), IEEE, pp. 166–176, doi:10.1109/sfcs.1978.34, S2CID 14348408

P82.	Pan, Victor Y. (1982), "Trilinear aggregating with implicit canceling for a new acceleration of matrix multiplication", Computers and Mathematics with Applications, 8: 23–34, doi:10.1016/0898-1221(82)90037-2, MR 0644547

FRM.	Huang, Xiaohan; Pan, Victor Y. (1998), "Fast rectangular matrix multiplication and applications", Journal of Complexity, 14 (2): 257–299, doi:10.1006/jcom.1998.0476, MR 1629113

MPD.	Mourrain, Bernard; Pan, Victor Y. (2000), "Multivariate polynomials, duality, and structured matrices" (PDF), Journal of Complexity, 16 (1): 110–180, doi:10.1006/jcom.1999.0530, MR 1762401 (winner, J. Complexity best paper award)

UP.	Pan, Victor Y. (2002), "Univariate polynomials: nearly optimal algorithms for numerical factorization and root-finding", Journal of Symbolic Computation, 33 (5): 701–733, doi:10.1006/jsco.2002.0531, MR 1919911

=== Books ===
HMM.	Pan, Victor (1984), How to Multiply Matrices Faster, Lecture Notes in Computer Science, vol. 179, Berlin: Springer-Verlag, doi:10.1007/3-540-13866-8, ISBN 3-540-13866-8, S2CID 5280107

PMC.	Bini, Dario; Pan, Victor Y. (1994), Polynomial and Matrix Computations, Vol. I: Fundamental Algorithms, Progress in Theoretical Computer Science, Boston, MA: Birkhäuser, doi:10.1007/978-1-4612-0265-3, ISBN 0-8176-3786-9, S2CID 30728536

SMP.	Pan, Victor Y. (2001), Structured Matrices and Polynomials: Unified Superfast Algorithms, New York: Springer-Verlag, doi:10.1007/978-1-4612-0129-8, ISBN 0-8176-4240-4

NMR.	McNamee, J. M.; Pan, V. Y. (2013), Numerical Methods for Roots of Polynomials, Part II, Studies in Computational Mathematics, vol. 16, Amsterdam: Elsevier/Academic Press, ISBN 978-0-444-52730-1
