= Fulkerson–Chen–Anstee theorem =

The Fulkerson–Chen–Anstee theorem is a result in graph theory, a branch of combinatorics. It provides one of two known approaches solving the digraph realization problem, i.e. it gives a necessary and sufficient condition for pairs of nonnegative integers $((a_1,b_1),\ldots,(a_n,b_n))$ to be the indegree-outdegree pairs of a simple directed graph; a sequence obeying these conditions is called "digraphic". D. R. Fulkerson (1960) obtained a characterization analogous to the classical Erdős–Gallai theorem for graphs, but in contrast to this solution with exponentially many inequalities. In 1966 Chen improved this result in demanding the additional constraint that the integer pairs must be sorted in non-increasing lexicographical order leading to n inequalities. Anstee (1982) observed in a different context that it is sufficient to have $a_1\geq\cdots\geq a_n$. Berger reinvented this result and gives a direct proof.

== Statement ==
A sequence $((a_1,b_1 ),\ldots,(a_n,b_n))$ of nonnegative integer pairs with $a_1\geq\cdots\geq a_n$ is digraphic if and only if $\sum_{i=1}^{n}a_i=\sum_{i=1}^{n}b_i$ and the following inequality holds for k such that $1 \leq k \leq n$:

$$\sum^k_{i=1} a_i\leq \sum^k_{i=1} \min(b_i,k-1)+ \sum^n_{i=k+1} \min(b_i,k)$$

== Stronger versions ==
Berger proved that it suffices to consider the $k$th inequality such that $1 \leq k < n$ with $a_k > a_{k+1}$ and for $k = n$.

== Other notations ==
The theorem can also be stated in terms of zero-one matrices. The connection can be seen if one realizes that each directed graph has an adjacency matrix where the column sums and row sums correspond to $(a_1,\ldots,a_n)$ and $(b_1,\ldots,b_n)$. Note that the diagonal of the matrix only contains zeros. There is a connection to the relation majorization. We define a sequence $(a^*_1,\ldots,a^*_n)$ with $a^*_k:=|\{b_i|i>k, b_i \geq k\}| + |\{b_i|i \leq k, b_i \geq k-1\}|$. Sequence $(a^*_1,\ldots,a^*_n)$ can also be determined by a corrected Ferrers diagram. Consider sequences $(a_1,\ldots,a_n)$, $(b_1,\ldots,b_n)$ and $(a^*_1,\ldots,a^*_n)$ as $n$-dimensional vectors $a$, $b$ and $a^*$. Since $\sum_{i=1}^k a^*_i = \sum^k_{i=1} \min(b_i,k-1)+ \sum^n_{i=k+1} \min(b_i,k)$ by applying the principle of double counting, the theorem above states that a pair of nonnegative integer sequences $(a,b)$ with nonincreasing $a$ is digraphic if and only if vector $a^*$ majorizes $a$.

== Generalization ==
A sequence $((a_1,b_1 ),\ldots,(a_n,b_n))$ of nonnegative integer pairs with $a_1\geq\cdots\geq a_n$ is digraphic if and only if $\sum_{i=1}^{n}a_i=\sum_{i=1}^{n}b_i$ and there exists a sequence $c$ such that the pair $(c,b)$ is digraphic and $c$ majorizes $a$.

== Characterizations for similar problems ==
Similar theorems describe the degree sequences of simple graphs, simple directed graphs with loops, and simple bipartite graphs. The first problem is characterized by the Erdős–Gallai theorem. The latter two cases, which are equivalent see Berger, are characterized by the Gale–Ryser theorem.

== See also ==
- Kleitman–Wang algorithms
