= Galactic algorithm =

Classification of algorithm

A galactic algorithm is an algorithm with state-of-the-art theoretical (asymptotic) performance, but which is not used due to practical constraints. Typical reasons are that the performance gains only appear for problems that are so large they never occur, or the algorithm's complexity outweighs a relatively small gain in real-world performance. Galactic algorithms were so named by Richard Lipton and Ken Regan, because they will never be used on any data sets on Earth.

== Possible use cases ==
Even if they are never used in practice, galactic algorithms may still contribute to computer science:

- An algorithm, even if impractical, may show new techniques that may eventually be used to create practical algorithms. See, for example, communication channel capacity, below.
- Available computational power may catch up to the crossover point, so that a previously impractical algorithm becomes practical. See, for example, low-density parity-check codes, below.
- An impractical algorithm can still demonstrate that conjectured bounds can be achieved, or that proposed bounds are wrong, and hence advance the theory of algorithms (see, for example, Reingold's algorithm for connectivity in undirected graphs). As Lipton states:
  This alone could be important and often is a great reason for finding such algorithms. For example, if tomorrow there were a discovery that showed there is a factoring algorithm with a huge but provably polynomial time bound, that would change our beliefs about factoring. The algorithm might never be used, but would certainly shape the future research into factoring.
  Similarly, a hypothetical algorithm for the Boolean satisfiability problem with a large but polynomial time bound, such as $\Theta\bigl(n^{2^{100}}\bigr)$, although unusable in practice, would settle the P versus NP problem, considered the most important open problem in computer science and one of the Millennium Prize Problems.

== Examples ==
=== Integer multiplication ===
An example of a galactic algorithm is the fastest (Note: As of October 2026, OpenAI has proposed a very slightly faster method with claimed complexity $O(n(\log n)^\alpha)$ for some $\alpha<1$. As a variant of the existing technique, even if it is proven to be correct, it inherits the same galactic behavior.) known way to multiply two numbers, which is based on a 1729-dimensional Fourier transform. It needs $O(n \log n)$ bit operations, but as the constants hidden by the big O notation are large, it is almost never used in practice. However, it also shows why galactic algorithms may still be useful. The authors state: "we are hopeful that with further refinements, the algorithm might become practical for numbers with merely billions or trillions of digits."

=== Primality testing ===
The AKS primality test is galactic. It is the most theoretically sound of any known algorithm that can take an arbitrary number and tell if it is prime. In particular, it is provably polynomial-time, deterministic, and unconditionally correct. All other known algorithms fall short on at least one of these criteria, but the shortcomings are minor and the calculations are much faster, so they are used instead. ECPP in practice runs much faster than AKS, but it has never been proven to be polynomial time. The Miller–Rabin test is also much faster than AKS, but produces only a probabilistic result. However the probability of error can be driven down to arbitrarily small values (say $< 10^{-100}$), good enough for practical purposes. There is also a deterministic version of the Miller-Rabin test, which runs in polynomial time over all inputs, but its correctness depends on the generalized Riemann hypothesis (which is widely believed, but not proven). The existence of these (much) faster alternatives means AKS is not used in practice.

=== Matrix multiplication ===
The first improvement over brute-force matrix multiplication (which takes $O(n^3)$ operations) was the Strassen algorithm: a recursive algorithm that takes $O(n^{2.807})$ operations. This algorithm is not galactic and is used in practice. Further extensions of this, using sophisticated group theory, are the Coppersmith–Winograd algorithm and its slightly better successors, taking $O(n^{2.373})$ operations. These are galactic – "We nevertheless stress that such improvements are only of theoretical interest, since the huge constants involved in the complexity of fast matrix multiplication usually make these algorithms impractical."

=== Communication channel capacity ===
Claude Shannon showed a simple but asymptotically optimal code that can reach the theoretical capacity of a communication channel. It requires assigning a random code word to every possible $n$-bit message, then decoding by finding the closest code word. If $n$ is chosen large enough, this beats any existing code and can get arbitrarily close to the capacity of the channel. Unfortunately, any $n$ big enough to beat existing codes is also completely impractical. These codes, though never used, inspired decades of research into more practical algorithms that today can achieve rates arbitrarily close to the ideal channel capacity.

=== Sub-graphs ===
The problem of deciding whether a graph $G$ contains $H$ as a minor is NP-complete in general, but where $H$ is fixed, it can be solved in polynomial time. The running time for testing whether $H$ is a minor of $G$ in this case is $O(n^2)$, where $n$ is the number of vertices in $G$ and the big O notation hides a constant that depends superexponentially on $H$. The constant is greater than $2 \uparrow \uparrow (2 \uparrow \uparrow (2 \uparrow \uparrow (h/2) ) )$ in Knuth's up-arrow notation, where $h$ is the number of vertices in $H$. Even the case of $h = 4$ cannot be reasonably computed as the constant is greater than 2 pentated by 4, or 2 tetrated by 65536, that is, $2 \uparrow \uparrow \uparrow 4 = {}^{65536}2 = \underbrace{2^{2^{\cdot^{\cdot^2}}}}_{65536}$.

=== Cryptographic breaks ===
In cryptography jargon, a "break" is any attack faster in expectation than brute force – i.e., performing one trial decryption for each possible key. For many cryptographic systems, breaks are known, but are still practically infeasible with current technology. One example is the best attack known against 128-bit AES, which takes only $2^{126}$ operations. Despite being impractical, theoretical breaks can provide insight into vulnerability patterns, and sometimes lead to discovery of exploitable breaks.

=== Traveling salesman problem ===
For several decades, the best known approximation to the traveling salesman problem in a metric space was the simple Christofides algorithm which produced a path at most 50% longer than the optimum. (Many other algorithms could usually do much better, but could not provably do so.) In 2020, a newer and much more complex algorithm was discovered that beat this algorithm by $10^{-34}$ percent. Although no one will ever switch to this algorithm for its very slight worst-case improvement, it is still considered important because "this minuscule improvement breaks through both a theoretical logjam and a psychological one".

=== Hutter search ===
A single algorithm, "Hutter search", can solve any well-defined problem in an asymptotically optimal time, barring some caveats. It works by searching through all possible algorithms (by runtime), while simultaneously searching through all possible proofs (by length of proof), looking for a proof of correctness for each algorithm. Since the proof of correctness is of finite size, it "only" adds a constant and does not affect the asymptotic runtime. However, this constant is so big that the algorithm is entirely impractical. For example, if the shortest proof of correctness of a given algorithm is 1000 bits long, the search will examine at least 2^{999} other potential proofs first.

Hutter search is related to Solomonoff induction, which is a formalization of Bayesian inference. All computable theories (as implemented by programs) which perfectly describe previous observations are used to calculate the probability of the next observation, with more weight put on the shorter computable theories. Again, the search over all possible explanations makes this procedure galactic.

=== Optimization ===
Simulated annealing, when used with a logarithmic cooling schedule, has been proven to find the global optimum of any optimization problem. However, such a cooling schedule results in entirely impractical runtimes, and is never used. However, knowing this ideal algorithm exists has led to practical variants that are able to find very good (though not provably optimal) solutions to complex optimization problems.

=== Minimum spanning trees ===
The expected linear time MST algorithm is able to discover the minimum spanning tree of a graph in $O(m + n)$, where $m$ is the number of edges and $n$ is the number of nodes of the graph. However, the constant factor that is hidden by the Big O notation is huge enough to make the algorithm impractical. An implementation is publicly available and given the experimentally estimated implementation constants, it would only be faster than Borůvka's algorithm for graphs in which $m + n > 9 \cdot 10^{151}$.

=== Hash tables ===
Researchers have found an algorithm that achieves the provably best-possible asymptotic performance in terms of time-space tradeoff in hash tables. But it remains purely theoretical: "Despite the new hash table’s unprecedented efficiency, no one is likely to try building it anytime soon. It’s just too complicated to construct." and "in practice, constants really matter. In the real world, a factor of 10 is a game ender.”

=== Connectivity in undirected graphs ===
Connectivity in undirected graphs (also known as USTCON, for Undirected Source-Target CONnectivity) is the problem of deciding if a path exists between two nodes in an undirected graph, or in other words, if they are in the same connected component. When the usage of $O(\text{N})$ space is allowed, almost-linear time solutions using disjoint-set data structures have been known and used for decades. But for many years it was unknown if this could be done deterministically in $O(\log N)$ space (class L), though it was known to be possible with randomized algorithms (class RL).

A breakthrough 2008 paper by Omer Reingold showed that USTCON is in fact in L, providing an algorithm with asymptotically better space requirement. However, the algorithm's very large constant hidden by the $O(\log N)$ means that on any realistic problem it consumes significantly more memory and computation time than the well known $O(N)$ algorithms. Despite not being used in practice, the paper is still a landmark in theory, and has been cited more than 1000 times as of 2026.

=== Low-density parity-check codes ===
Low-density parity-check codes, also known as LDPC or Gallager codes, are an example of an algorithm that was galactic when first developed, but became practical as computation improved. They were originally conceived by Robert G. Gallager in his doctoral dissertation at the Massachusetts Institute of Technology in 1960. Although their performance was much better than other codes of that time, reaching the Gilbert–Varshamov bound for linear codes, the codes were largely ignored as their iterative decoding algorithm was prohibitively computationally expensive for the hardware available.

Renewed interest in LDPC codes emerged following the invention of the closely related turbo codes (1993), whose similarly iterative decoding algorithm outperformed other codes used at that time. LDPC codes were subsequently rediscovered in 1996, and became popular as a patent-free alternative. Even though the turbo code patents have now expired, LDPC codes also have some technical advantages, and are used in many applications today.

=== Polygon triangulation ===
Polygon triangulation is the division of a polygon into non-overlapping triangles. Bernard Chazelle showed in 1991 that any simple polygon can be triangulated in linear time. However the proposed algorithm is extremely complex, and much simpler algorithms with near-linear $O(\text{Nlog}^*\text{N})$ performance are available, so these are used instead. "His [Chazelle's] work represents an important theoretical breakthrough. However, his O(n) algorithm has appeared as very difficult to program and thus, to the knowledge of the authors, there is still no practical implementation available."
