= Combinatorial matrix theory =

Combinatorial matrix theory is a branch of linear algebra and combinatorics that studies matrices in terms of the patterns of nonzeros and of positive and negative values in their coefficients.

Concepts and topics studied within combinatorial matrix theory include:

- (0,1)-matrix, a matrix whose coefficients are all 0 or 1
- Permutation matrix, a (0,1)-matrix with exactly one nonzero in each row and each column
- The Gale–Ryser theorem, on the existence of (0,1)-matrices with given row and column sums
- Hadamard matrix, a square matrix of 1 and −1 coefficients with each pair of rows having matching coefficients in exactly half of their columns
- Alternating sign matrix, a matrix of 0, 1, and −1 coefficients with the nonzeros in each row or column alternating between 1 and −1 and summing to 1
- Sparse matrix, is a matrix with few nonzero elements, and sparse matrices of special form such as diagonal matrices and band matrices
- Sylvester's law of inertia, on the invariance of the number of negative diagonal elements of a matrix under changes of basis

Researchers in combinatorial matrix theory include Richard A. Brualdi and Pauline van den Driessche.
