= Degree (graph theory) =

Number of edges touching a vertex in a graph

A graph with a loop having vertices labeled by degree

In graph theory, the degree (or valency) of a vertex of a graph is the number of edges that are incident to the vertex; in a multigraph, a loop contributes 2 to a vertex's degree, for the two ends of the edge. The degree of a vertex $v$ is denoted $\deg(v)$ or $\deg v$. The maximum degree of a graph $G$ is denoted by $\Delta(G)$, and is the maximum of $G$'s vertices' degrees. The minimum degree of a graph is denoted by $\delta(G)$, and is the minimum of $G$'s vertices' degrees. In the multigraph shown on the right, the maximum degree is 5 and the minimum degree is 0.

In a regular graph, every vertex has the same degree, and so we can speak of the degree of the graph. A complete graph (denoted $K_n$, where $n$ is the number of vertices in the graph) is a special kind of regular graph where all vertices have the maximum possible degree, $n-1$.

In a signed graph, the number of positive edges connected to a vertex is called its positive degree and the number of connected negative edges is called negative degree.

== Handshaking lemma ==
The degree sum formula states that, given a graph $G=(V, E)$,

$$\sum_{v \in V} \deg(v) = 2|E|\,$$.

The formula implies that in any undirected graph, the number of vertices with odd degree is even. This statement (as well as the degree sum formula) is known as the handshaking lemma. The latter name comes from a popular mathematical problem, which is to prove that in any group of people, the number of people who have shaken hands with an odd number of other people from the group is even.

== Degree sequence ==
Two non-isomorphic graphs with the same degree sequence (3, 2, 2, 2, 2, 1, 1, 1).

The degree sequence of an undirected graph is the non-increasing sequence of its vertex degrees; for the above graph it is (5, 3, 3, 2, 2, 1, 0). The degree sequence is a graph invariant, so isomorphic graphs have the same degree sequence. However, the degree sequence does not, in general, uniquely identify a graph; in some cases, non-isomorphic graphs have the same degree sequence. A graph that is identified up to isomorphism by its degree sequence is called unigraph and the corresponding degree sequence is called unigraphic.

The degree sequence problem is the problem of finding some or all graphs with the degree sequence being a given non-increasing sequence of positive integers. (Trailing zeroes may be ignored since they are trivially realized by adding an appropriate number of isolated vertices to the graph.) A sequence which is the degree sequence of some simple graph, i.e. for which the degree sequence problem has a solution, is called a graphic or graphical sequence. As a consequence of the degree sum formula, any sequence with an odd sum, such as (3, 3, 1), cannot be realized as the degree sequence of a graph. The inverse is also true: if a sequence has an even sum, it is the degree sequence of a multigraph. The construction of such a graph is straightforward: connect vertices with odd degrees in pairs (forming a matching), and fill out the remaining even degree counts by self-loops. The question of whether a given degree sequence can be realized by a simple graph is more challenging. This problem is also called graph realization problem and can be solved by either the Erdős–Gallai theorem or the Havel–Hakimi algorithm. The problem of finding or estimating the number of graphs with a given degree sequence is a problem from the field of graph enumeration.

More generally, the degree sequence of a hypergraph is the non-increasing sequence of its vertex degrees. A sequence is $k$-graphic if it is the degree sequence of some simple $k$-uniform hypergraph. In particular, a $2$-graphic sequence is graphic. Deciding if a given sequence is $k$-graphic is doable in polynomial time for $k=2$ via the Erdős–Gallai theorem but is NP-complete for all $k\ge 3$.

== Special values ==
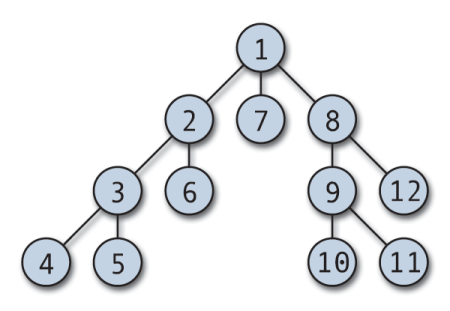
An undirected graph with leaf nodes 4, 5, 6, 7, 10, 11, and 12

- A vertex with degree 0 is called an isolated vertex.
- A vertex with degree 1 is called a leaf vertex or end vertex or a pendant vertex, and the edge incident with that vertex is called a pendant edge. In the graph on the right, {3,5} is a pendant edge. This terminology is common in the study of trees in graph theory and especially trees as data structures.
- A vertex with degree n − 1 in a graph on n vertices is called a dominating vertex.

== Global properties ==
- If each vertex of the graph has the same degree k, the graph is called a k-regular graph and the graph itself is said to have degree k. Similarly, a bipartite graph in which every two vertices on the same side of the bipartition as each other have the same degree is called a biregular graph.
- An undirected, connected graph has an Eulerian path if and only if it has either 0 or 2 vertices of odd degree. If it has 0 vertices of odd degree, the Eulerian path is an Eulerian circuit.
- A directed graph is a directed pseudoforest if and only if every vertex has outdegree at most 1. A functional graph is a special case of a pseudoforest in which every vertex has outdegree exactly 1.
- By Brooks' theorem, any graph G other than a clique or an odd cycle has chromatic number at most Δ(G), and by Vizing's theorem any graph has chromatic index at most Δ(G) + 1.
- A k-degenerate graph is a graph in which each subgraph has a vertex of degree at most k.

== See also ==
- Indegree, outdegree for digraphs
- Degree distribution
- Degree sequence for bipartite graphs
