= Computational complexity of matrix multiplication =

Algorithmic runtime requirements for matrix multiplication

Unsolved problem in computer science
What is the fastest algorithm for matrix multiplication?
Reported as unsolved in a source published in August 2026.
More unsolved problems in computer science

In theoretical computer science, the computational complexity of matrix multiplication dictates how quickly the operation of matrix multiplication can be performed. Matrix multiplication algorithms are a central subroutine in theoretical and numerical algorithms for numerical linear algebra and optimization, so finding the fastest algorithm for matrix multiplication is of major practical relevance.

Directly applying the mathematical definition of matrix multiplication gives an algorithm that requires n^{3} field operations to multiply two n × n matrices over that field (Θ(n^{3}) in big O notation). Surprisingly, algorithms exist that provide better running times than this straightforward "schoolbook algorithm". The first to be discovered was Strassen's algorithm, devised by Volker Strassen in 1969 and often referred to as "fast matrix multiplication". The optimal number of field operations needed to multiply two square n × n matrices up to constant factors is still unknown. This is a major open question in theoretical computer science.

As of August 2026, the best bound on the asymptotic complexity of a matrix multiplication algorithm is O(n^{2.371177}). However, this and similar improvements to Strassen are not used in practice, because they are galactic algorithms: the constant coefficient hidden by the big O notation is so large that they are only worthwhile for matrices that are too large to handle on present-day computers. Strassen can be used recursively though on smaller submatrices and improvements in those will lead to general improvement.

== Simple algorithms ==
If A, B are two n × n matrices over a field, then their product AB is also an n × n matrix over that field, defined entrywise as
$$(AB)_{ij} = \sum_{k = 1}^n A_{ik} B_{kj}.$$

=== Schoolbook algorithm ===
The simplest approach to computing the product of two n × n matrices A and B is to compute the arithmetic expressions coming from the definition of matrix multiplication. In pseudocode:

input A and B, both n by n matrices
initialize C to be an n by n matrix of all zeros
for i from 1 to n:
    for j from 1 to n:
        for k from 1 to n:
            C[i][j] = C[i][j] + A[i][k]*B[k][j]
output C (as A*B)

This algorithm requires $n^3$ multiplications and $n^3 - n^2$ additions of scalars for computing the product of two square n×n matrices. Its computational complexity is therefore $O(n^3)$, in a model of computation where field operations (addition and multiplication) take constant time (in practice, this is the case for floating point numbers, but not necessarily for integers).

=== Strassen's algorithm ===
Strassen's algorithm improves on naive matrix multiplication through a divide-and-conquer approach. The key observation is that multiplying two 2 × 2 matrices can be done with only seven multiplications, instead of the usual eight (at the expense of 11 additional addition and subtraction operations). This means that, treating the input n×n matrices as block 2 × 2 matrices, the task of multiplying two n×n matrices can be reduced to seven subproblems of multiplying two n/2×n/2 matrices. Applying this recursively gives an algorithm needing $O( n^{\log_{2}7}) \approx O(n^{2.807})$ field operations.

Unlike algorithms with faster asymptotic complexity, Strassen's algorithm is used in practice. The numerical stability is reduced compared to the naive algorithm, but it is faster in cases where n > 100 or so and appears in several libraries, such as BLAS. Fast matrix multiplication algorithms cannot achieve component-wise stability, but some can be shown to exhibit norm-wise stability. It is very useful for large matrices over exact domains such as finite fields, where numerical stability is not an issue.

== Matrix multiplication exponent ==
Improvement of estimates of the exponent ω over time for the computational complexity $O(n^\omega)$ of matrix multiplication, plotted with loglog ω scale

Timeline of matrix multiplication exponent
Year	Bound on ω	Authors
1969	2.8074	Strassen
1978	2.796	Pan
1979	2.780	Bini, Capovani, Romani
1981	2.522	Schönhage
1981	2.517	Romani
1981	2.496	Coppersmith, Winograd
1986	2.479	Strassen
1990	2.3755	Coppersmith, Winograd
2010	2.3737	Stothers
2012	2.3729	Williams
2014	2.3728639	Le Gall
2020	2.3728596	Alman, Williams
2022	2.371866	Duan, Wu, Zhou
2024	2.371552	Williams, Xu, Xu, and Zhou
2024	2.371339	Alman, Duan, Williams, Xu, Xu, and Zhou
2026	2.371177	Dupont, Eisenberger, Kozlovskii, Mehrabian, Ruiz, See, Zhou, Alman, Williams, Balog

The matrix multiplication exponent, usually denoted ω, is the smallest real number for which any two $n\times n$ matrices over a field can be multiplied together using $n^{\omega + o(1)}$ field operations. This notation is commonly used in algorithms research, so that algorithms using matrix multiplication as a subroutine have bounds on running time that can update as bounds on ω improve.

Using a naive lower bound and schoolbook matrix multiplication for the upper bound, one can straightforwardly conclude that 2 ≤ ω ≤ 3. Whether ω = 2 is a major open question in theoretical computer science, and there is a line of research developing matrix multiplication algorithms to get improved bounds on ω.

All recent algorithms in this line of research use the laser method, a generalization of the Coppersmith–Winograd algorithm, which was given by Don Coppersmith and Shmuel Winograd in 1990 and was the best matrix multiplication algorithm until 2010. The conceptual idea of these algorithms is similar to Strassen's algorithm: a method is devised for multiplying two k × k-matrices with fewer than k^{3} multiplications, and this technique is applied recursively. The laser method has limitations to its power: Ambainis, Filmus and François Le Gall (Note: Not to be confused with Jean-François Le Gall) prove that it cannot be used to show that ω < 2.3725 by analyzing higher and higher tensor powers of a certain identity of Coppersmith and Winograd and neither ω < 2.3078 for a wide class of variants of this approach. In 2022 Duan, Wu and Zhou devised a variant breaking the first of the two barriers with ω < 2.37188, they do so by identifying a source of potential optimization in the laser method termed combination loss for which they compensate using an asymmetric version of the hashing method in the Coppersmith–Winograd algorithm.

Nonetheless, the above are classical examples of galactic algorithms. On the opposite, the above Strassen's algorithm of 1969 and Pan's algorithm of 1978, whose respective exponents are slightly above and below 2.8, have constant coefficients that make them feasible.

=== Group theory reformulation of matrix multiplication algorithms ===
Henry Cohn, Robert Kleinberg, Balázs Szegedy and Chris Umans put methods such as the Strassen and Coppersmith–Winograd algorithms in an entirely different group-theoretic context, by utilising triples of subsets of finite groups which satisfy a disjointness property called the triple product property (TPP). They also give conjectures that, if true, would imply that there are matrix multiplication algorithms with essentially quadratic complexity. This implies that the optimal exponent of matrix multiplication is 2, which most researchers believe is indeed the case. One such conjecture is that families of wreath products of Abelian groups with symmetric groups realise families of subset triples with a simultaneous version of the TPP. Several of their conjectures have since been disproven by Blasiak, Cohn, Church, Grochow, Naslund, Sawin, and Umans using the Slice Rank method. Further, Alon, Shpilka and Chris Umans have recently shown that some of these conjectures implying fast matrix multiplication are incompatible with another plausible conjecture, the sunflower conjecture, which in turn is related to the cap set problem.

=== Lower bounds for ω ===
There is a trivial lower bound of $\omega \ge 2$. Since any algorithm for multiplying two n × n-matrices has to process all 2n^{2} entries, there is a trivial asymptotic lower bound of Ω(n^{2}) operations for any matrix multiplication algorithm. Thus $2\le \omega < 2.371177$. It is unknown whether $\omega > 2$. The best known lower bound for matrix-multiplication complexity is Ω(n^{2} log(n)), for bounded coefficient arithmetic circuits over the real or complex numbers, and is due to Ran Raz.

It is known that, under the model of computation typically studied, there is no matrix multiplication algorithm that uses precisely O(n^{ω}) operations; there must be an additional factor of n^{o(1)}.

=== Rectangular matrix multiplication ===
Similar techniques also apply to rectangular matrix multiplication. The central object of study is $\omega(k)$, which is the smallest $c$ such that one can multiply a matrix of size $n\times \lceil n^k\rceil$ with a matrix of size $\lceil n^k\rceil \times n$ with $O(n^{c + o(1)})$ arithmetic operations. A result in algebraic complexity states that multiplying matrices of size $n\times \lceil n^k\rceil$ and $\lceil n^k\rceil \times n$ requires the same number of arithmetic operations as multiplying matrices of size $n\times \lceil n^k\rceil$ and $n \times n$ and of size $n \times n$ and $n\times \lceil n^k\rceil$, so this encompasses the complexity of rectangular matrix multiplication. This generalizes the square matrix multiplication exponent, since $\omega(1) = \omega$.

Since the output of the matrix multiplication problem is size $n^2$, we have $\omega(k) \geq 2$ for all values of $k$. If one can prove for some values of $k$ between 0 and 1 that $\omega(k) \leq 2$, then such a result shows that $\omega(k) = 2$ for those $k$. The largest k such that $\omega(k) = 2$ is known as the dual matrix multiplication exponent, usually denoted α. α is referred to as the "dual" because showing that $\alpha = 1$ is equivalent to showing that $\omega = 2$. Like the matrix multiplication exponent, the dual matrix multiplication exponent sometimes appears in the complexity of algorithms in numerical linear algebra and optimization.

The first bound on α is by Coppersmith in 1982, who showed that $\alpha > 0.17227$. The current best peer-reviewed bound on α is $\alpha \geq 0.321334$, given by Williams, Xu, Xu, and Zhou.

== Bit complexity of matrix multiplication ==
The algebraic model detailed above assumes that each field operation like addition or multiplications takes uniform cost $O(1)$. This is a realistic assumption for exact arithmetic in finite fields or approximate arithmetic of floating point numbers.

Over different arithmetic domains such as exact arithmetic over the integers this assumption is no longer justified and one takes into account that the computational costs of arithmetic operations depend on the bit length of the arguments. This is called bit complexity.

Harvey and van der Hoeven record the general bound of $O( d^{\omega}\text{M}(n + \lg(d))$ operations in the model of multitape Turing machine where $d$ is the dimension of the two square matrices, $n$ is the maximal bit size of the integer matrix coefficients, $\omega$ denotes the matrix multiplication exponent in the algebraic model introduced above, $\text{M}(x)=O(x\log(x))$ denotes the complexity of multiplying two integers of x bit length and $\lg(d)=\lceil\log_2(d)\rceil$ is a particular choice of logarithm. They also give improved bounds conditional on the matrix dimension not being too large compared to the bit length of the coefficients, e.g. if $\lg(d)<Cn$ for some constant $C>1$.

The example of finite fields above vs. the integers demonstrates that the bit complexity of matrix multiplication depends on the arithmetic domain of the matrix coefficient. For finite fields the bit length of the coefficients can be bounded by a constant and no intermediate coefficient growth can occur. For integers this phenomenon leads to the inclusion of the term $\lg(d)$ in the factor $\text{M}(n+\lg(d))$ reflecting the multiplication of integers of potentially ever larger bit length during the course of the matrix multiplication algorithm.

== Related problems ==
Problems that have the same asymptotic complexity as matrix multiplication include determinant, matrix inversion, Gaussian elimination (see next section). Problems with complexity that is expressible in terms of $\omega$ include characteristic polynomial, eigenvalues (but not eigenvectors), Hermite normal form, and Smith normal form.

=== Matrix inversion, determinant and Gaussian elimination ===
In his 1969 paper, where he proved the complexity $O(n^{\log_2 7}) \approx O(n^{2.807})$ for matrix computation, Strassen proved also that matrix inversion, determinant and Gaussian elimination have, up to a multiplicative constant, the same computational complexity as matrix multiplication. The proof does not make any assumptions on matrix multiplication that is used, except that its complexity is $O(n^\omega)$ for some $\omega \ge 2$.

The starting point of Strassen's proof is using block matrix multiplication. Specifically, a matrix of even dimension 2n×2n may be partitioned in four n×n blocks
$$\begin{bmatrix} {A} & {B} \\{C} & {D} \end{bmatrix}.$$
Under this form, its inverse is
$$\begin{bmatrix} {A} & {B} \\ {C} & {D} \end{bmatrix}^{-1} =
\begin{bmatrix}
{A}^{-1}+{A}^{-1}{B}({D}-{CA}^{-1}{B})^{-1}{CA}^{-1} & -{A}^{-1}{B}({D}-{CA}^{-1}{B})^{-1}
\\ -({D}-{CA}^{-1}{B})^{-1}{CA}^{-1} & ({D}-{CA}^{-1}{B})^{-1}
\end{bmatrix},$$
provided that A and ${D}-{CA}^{-1}{B}$ are invertible.

Thus, the inverse of a 2n×2n matrix may be computed with two inversions, six multiplications and four additions or additive inverses of n×n matrices. It follows that, denoting respectively by I(n), M(n) and A(n) = n^{2} the number of operations needed for inverting, multiplying and adding n×n matrices, one has
$$I(2n) \le 2I(n) + 6M(n)+ 4 A(n).$$
If $n=2^k,$ one may apply this formula recursively:
$$\begin{align}
I(2^k) &\le 2I(2^{k-1}) + 6M(2^{k-1})+ 4 A(2^{k-1})\\
&\le 2^2I(2^{k-2}) + 6(M(2^{k-1})+2M(2^{k-2})) + 4(A(2^{k-1}) + 2A(2^{k-2}))\\
&\,\,\,\vdots
\end{align}$$
If $M(n)\le cn^\omega,$ and $\alpha=2^\omega\ge 4,$ one gets eventually
$$\begin{align}
I(2^k) &\le 2^k I(1) + 6c(\alpha^{k-1}+2\alpha^{k-2} + \cdots +2^{k-1}\alpha^0) + k 2^{k+1}\\
&\le 2^k + 6c\frac{\alpha^k-2^k}{\alpha-2} + k 2^{k+1}\\
&\le d(2^k)^\omega
\end{align}$$
for some constant d.

For matrices whose dimension is not a power of two, the same complexity is reached by increasing the dimension of the matrix to a power of two, by padding the matrix with rows and columns whose entries are 1 on the diagonal and 0 elsewhere.

This proves the asserted complexity for matrices such that all submatrices that have to be inverted are indeed invertible. This complexity is thus proved for almost all matrices, as a matrix with randomly chosen entries is invertible with probability one.

The same argument applies to LU decomposition, as, if the matrix A is invertible, the equality
$$\begin{bmatrix} {A} & {B} \\{C} & {D} \end{bmatrix}
= \begin{bmatrix}I & 0\\CA^{-1}&I\end{bmatrix}\,\begin{bmatrix}A&B\\0&D-CA^{-1}B\end{bmatrix}$$
defines a block LU decomposition that may be applied recursively to $A$ and $D-CA^{-1}B,$ for getting eventually a true LU decomposition of the original matrix.

The argument applies also for the determinant, since it results from the block LU decomposition that
$$\det \begin{bmatrix} {A} & {B} \\{C} & {D} \end{bmatrix} =
\det(A)\det(D-CA^{-1}B).$$

=== Minimizing number of multiplications ===
Related to the problem of minimizing the number of arithmetic operations is minimizing the number of multiplications, which is typically a more costly operation than addition. A $O(n^\omega)$ algorithm for matrix multiplication must necessarily only use $O(n^\omega)$ multiplication operations, but these algorithms are impractical. For a fixed matrix size, one usually counts the multiplications of a non-commutative (bilinear) algorithm, which does not assume that the matrix entries commute. The minimum number of such multiplications is the tensor rank of the corresponding matrix multiplication tensor. Only non-commutative algorithms can be applied recursively to block matrices: an algorithm that multiplies two $k\times k$ matrices with $r$ multiplications yields an $O(n^{\log_k r})$ algorithm for $n\times n$ matrices. Algorithms (if those existed of course) that exploit commutativity of the entries may use fewer multiplications for a fixed size, but they cannot be applied recursively.

For $2\times 2$ matrices the problem is settled. Seven multiplications are necessary, so Strassen's algorithm is optimal, in this case 15 additions are minimal, compared to only four additions for eight multiplications.

For $3\times 3$ matrices, the best known non-commutative algorithm uses 23 multiplications. Over a commutative ring, 21 multiplications suffice. Bläser proved that any bilinear algorithm multiplying $n\times m$ matrices with $m\times n$ matrices needs at least $2mn+2n-m-2$ multiplications when $m \ge n \ge 3$, which gives at least 19 multiplications for $n=3$ and at least 34 for $n=4$. Over $\mathbb{Z}/2\mathbb{Z}$, a computer-assisted proof raised the $3\times 3$ lower bound to 20.

For $4\times 4$ matrices, two levels of Strassen's algorithm give 49 multiplications over any ring. In characteristic 2, including $\mathbb{Z}/2\mathbb{Z}$, 47 multiplications suffice. In 2025, the evolutionary coding agent AlphaEvolve found a non-commutative algorithm with 48 multiplications and complex coefficients, the first with fewer than 49 multiplications over fields of characteristic 0. Dumas, Pernet and Sedoglavic transformed it into an equivalent algorithm with rational coefficients, valid over any ring in which 2 is invertible. Applied recursively using Strassen algorithm, it gives the exponent $\log_4 48 = 2 + \log_4 3 \approx 2.7925$, compared with $\log_2 7 \approx 2.8074$ for naive Strassen algorithm. Algorithms (if those existed) that exploit commutativity had needed fewer multiplications long before: Winograd's 1968 algorithm uses 48 over any commutative ring, and Waksman's 1970 variant uses 46 when division by 2 is allowed.

== See also ==
- Computational complexity of mathematical operations
- CYK algorithm § Valiant's algorithm
- Freivalds' algorithm, a simple Monte Carlo algorithm that, given matrices A, B and C, verifies in Θ(n^{2}) time if AB = C.
- Matrix chain multiplication
- Matrix multiplication, for abstract definitions
- Matrix multiplication algorithm, for practical implementation details
- Sparse matrix–vector multiplication
