= Computational complexity of mathematical operations =

Algorithmic runtime requirements for common math procedures

Graphs of functions commonly used in the analysis of algorithms, showing the number of operations $N$ versus input size $n$ for each function

The following tables list the computational complexity of various algorithms for common mathematical operations.

Here, complexity refers to the time complexity of performing computations on a multitape Turing machine. See big O notation for an explanation of the notation used.

Note: Due to the variety of multiplication algorithms, $M(n)$ below stands in for the complexity of the chosen multiplication algorithm.

== Arithmetic functions ==
This table lists the complexity of mathematical operations on integers.

Operation	Input	Output	Algorithm	Complexity
Addition	Two $n$-digit numbers	One $n+1$-digit number	Schoolbook addition with carry	$O\mathord\left(n\right)$
Subtraction	Two $n$-digit numbers	One $n$-digit number	Schoolbook subtraction with borrow	$O\mathord\left(n\right)$
Multiplication	Two $n$-digit numbers	One $2n$-digit number	Schoolbook long multiplication	$O\mathord\left(n^{2}\right)$
Multiplication	Two $n$-digit numbers	One $2n$-digit number	Karatsuba algorithm	$O\mathord\left(n^{1.585}\right)$
Multiplication	Two $n$-digit numbers	One $2n$-digit number	3-way Toom–Cook multiplication	$O\mathord\left(n^{1.465}\right)$
Multiplication	Two $n$-digit numbers	One $2n$-digit number	$k$-way Toom–Cook multiplication	$O\mathord\left(n^{\frac{\log(2k - 1)}{\log k}}\right)$
Multiplication	Two $n$-digit numbers	One $2n$-digit number	Mixed-level Toom–Cook (Knuth 4.3.3-T)	$O\mathord\left(n \, 2^{\sqrt{2 \log n}} \, \log n\right)$
Multiplication	Two $n$-digit numbers	One $2n$-digit number	Schönhage–Strassen algorithm	$O\mathord\left(n \log n \log \log n\right)$
Multiplication	Two $n$-digit numbers	One $2n$-digit number	Harvey-Hoeven algorithm	$O(n \log n)$
Division	Two $n$-digit numbers	One $n$-digit number	Schoolbook long division	$O\mathord\left(n^{2}\right)$
Division	Two $n$-digit numbers	One $n$-digit number	Burnikel–Ziegler Divide-and-Conquer Division	$O(M(n) \log n)$
Division	Two $n$-digit numbers	One $n$-digit number	Newton–Raphson division	$O(M(n))$
Square root	One $n$-digit number	One $n/2$-digit number	Newton's method	$O(M(n))$
Modular exponentiation	Two $n$-digit integers and a $k$-bit exponent	One $n$-digit integer	Repeated multiplication and reduction	$O\mathord\left(M(n) \, 2^{k}\right)$
Modular exponentiation	Two $n$-digit integers and a $k$-bit exponent	One $n$-digit integer	Exponentiation by squaring	$O(M(n) \, k)$
Modular exponentiation	Two $n$-digit integers and a $k$-bit exponent	One $n$-digit integer	Exponentiation with Montgomery reduction	$O(M(n) \, k)$

On stronger computational models, specifically a pointer machine and consequently also a unit-cost random-access machine it is possible to multiply two n-bit numbers in time O(n).

== Algebraic functions ==
Here we consider operations over polynomials and n denotes their degree; for the coefficients we use a unit-cost model, ignoring the number of bits in a number. In practice this means that we assume them to be machine integers. For this section $M(n)$ indicates the time needed for multiplying two polynomials of degree at most $n$.

Operation	Input	Output	Algorithm	Complexity
Polynomial evaluation	One polynomial of degree $n$ with integer coefficients	One number	Direct evaluation	$\Theta(n)$
Polynomial evaluation	One polynomial of degree $n$ with integer coefficients	One number	Horner's method	$\Theta(n)$
Polynomial multipoint evaluation	One polynomial of degree less than $n$ with integer coefficients and $n$ numbers as evaluation points	$n$ numbers	Direct evaluation	$\Theta(n^2)$
Polynomial multipoint evaluation	One polynomial of degree less than $n$ with integer coefficients and $n$ numbers as evaluation points	$n$ numbers	Fast multipoint evaluation	$O(M(n) \log n)$
Polynomial gcd (over $\mathbb{Z}[x]$ or $F[x]$)	Two polynomials of degree $n$ with integer coefficients	One polynomial of degree at most $n$	Euclidean algorithm	$O\mathord\left(n^{2}\right)$
Polynomial gcd (over $\mathbb{Z}[x]$ or $F[x]$)	Two polynomials of degree $n$ with integer coefficients	One polynomial of degree at most $n$	Fast Euclidean algorithm (Lehmer)	$O(M(n) \log n)$

== Special functions ==
Many of the methods in this section are given in Borwein & Borwein.

=== Elementary functions ===
The elementary functions are constructed by composing arithmetic operations, the exponential function ($\exp$), the natural logarithm ($\log$), trigonometric functions ($\sin, \cos$), and their inverses. The complexity of an elementary function is equivalent to that of its inverse, since all elementary functions are analytic and hence invertible by means of Newton's method. In particular, if either $\exp$ or $\log$ in the complex domain can be computed with some complexity, then that complexity is attainable for all other elementary functions.

Below, the size $n$ refers to the number of digits of precision at which the function is to be evaluated.

Algorithm	Applicability	Complexity
Taylor series; repeated argument reduction (e.g. $\exp(2x) = [\exp(x)]^2$) and direct summation	$\exp, \log, \sin, \cos, \arctan$	$O\mathord\left(M(n) n^{1/2}\right)$
Taylor series; FFT-based acceleration	$\exp, \log, \sin, \cos, \arctan$	$O\mathord\left(M(n) n^{1/3} (\log n)^2\right)$
Taylor series; binary splitting + bit-burst algorithm	$\exp, \log, \sin, \cos, \arctan$	$O\mathord\left(M(n) (\log n)^2\right)$
Arithmetic–geometric mean iteration	$\exp, \log, \sin, \cos, \arctan$	$O(M(n) \log n)$

It is not known whether $O(M(n) \log n)$ is the optimal complexity for elementary functions. The best known lower bound is the trivial bound $\Omega$$(M(n))$.

=== Non-elementary functions ===
Function	Input	Algorithm	Complexity
Gamma function	Integer $n$	Series approximation of the incomplete gamma function	$O\mathord\left(M(n) n^{1/2} (\log n)^2\right)$
Gamma function	Fixed rational number	Hypergeometric series	$O\mathord\left(M(n) (\log n)^2\right)$
Gamma function	$m/24$, for $m$ integer.	Arithmetic-geometric mean iteration	$O(M(n) \log n)$
Hypergeometric function ${}_p\!F_q$	$n$-digit number	(As described in Borwein & Borwein)	$O\mathord\left(M(n) n^{1/2} (\log n)^2\right)$
Hypergeometric function ${}_p\!F_q$	Fixed rational number	Hypergeometric series	$O\mathord\left(M(n) (\log n)^2\right)$

=== Mathematical constants ===
This table gives the complexity of computing approximations to the given constants to $n$ correct digits.

Constant	Algorithm	Complexity
Golden ratio, $\phi$	Newton's method	$O(M(n))$
Square root of 2, $\sqrt{2}$	Newton's method	$O(M(n))$
Euler's number, $e$	Binary splitting of the Taylor series for the exponential function	$O(M(n) \log n)$
Euler's number, $e$	Newton inversion of the natural logarithm	$O(M(n) \log n)$
Pi, $\pi$	Binary splitting of the arctan series in Machin's formula	$O\mathord\left(M(n) (\log n)^2\right)$
Pi, $\pi$	Gauss–Legendre algorithm	$O(M(n) \log n)$
Euler's constant, $\gamma$	Sweeney's method (approximation in terms of the exponential integral)	$O\mathord\left(M(n) (\log n)^2\right)$

== Number theory ==
Algorithms for number theoretical calculations are studied in computational number theory.

Operation	Input	Output	Algorithm	Complexity
Greatest common divisor	Two $n$-digit integers	One integer with at most $n$ digits	Euclidean algorithm	$O\mathord\left(n^{2}\right)$
Greatest common divisor	Two $n$-digit integers	One integer with at most $n$ digits	Binary GCD algorithm	$O\mathord\left(n^2\right)$
Greatest common divisor	Two $n$-digit integers	One integer with at most $n$ digits	Left/right k-ary binary GCD algorithm	$O\mathord\left(\frac{n^{2}}{\log n}\right)$
Greatest common divisor	Two $n$-digit integers	One integer with at most $n$ digits	Stehlé–Zimmermann algorithm	$O(M(n) \log n)$
Greatest common divisor	Two $n$-digit integers	One integer with at most $n$ digits	Schönhage controlled Euclidean descent algorithm	$O(M(n) \log n)$
Jacobi symbol	Two $n$-digit integers	$0$, $-1$ or $1$	Schönhage controlled Euclidean descent algorithm	$O(M(n) \log n)$
Jacobi symbol	Two $n$-digit integers	$0$, $-1$ or $1$	Stehlé–Zimmermann algorithm	$O(M(n) \log n)$
Factorial	A positive integer less than $m$	One $O(m \log m)$-digit integer	Bottom-up multiplication	$O\mathord\left(M\left(m^2\right) \log m\right)$
Factorial	A positive integer less than $m$	One $O(m \log m)$-digit integer	Binary splitting	$O(M(m \log m) \log m)$
Factorial	A positive integer less than $m$	One $O(m \log m)$-digit integer	Exponentiation of the prime factors of $m$	$O(M(m \log m) \log \log m)$, $O(M(m \log m))$
Primality test	A $n$-digit integer	True or false	AKS primality test	$O\mathord\left(n^{6+o(1)}\right)$ $O(n^{3})$, assuming Agrawal's conjecture
Primality test	A $n$-digit integer	True or false	Elliptic curve primality proving	$O\mathord\left(n^{4+\varepsilon}\right)$ heuristically
Primality test	A $n$-digit integer	True or false	Baillie–PSW primality test	$O\mathord\left(n^{2+\varepsilon}\right)$
Primality test	A $n$-digit integer	True or false	Miller–Rabin primality test	$O\mathord\left(kn^{2+\varepsilon}\right)$
Primality test	A $n$-digit integer	True or false	Solovay–Strassen primality test	$O\mathord\left(kn^{2+\varepsilon}\right)$
Integer factorization	A $b$-bit input integer	A set of factors	General number field sieve	$O\mathord\left((1+\varepsilon)^b\right)$ (Note: This form of sub-exponential time is valid for all $\varepsilon > 0$. A more precise form of the complexity can be given as $O\mathord\left(\exp\sqrt[3]{\frac{64}{9} b (\log b)^2}\right).$)
Integer factorization	A $b$-bit input integer	A set of factors	Shor's algorithm	$O(M(b) b)$, on a quantum computer

== Matrix algebra ==
The following complexity figures assume that arithmetic with individual elements has complexity O(1), as is the case with fixed-precision floating-point arithmetic or operations on a finite field.

Operation	Input	Output	Algorithm	Complexity
Matrix multiplication	Two $n \times n$ matrices	One $n \times n$ matrix	Schoolbook matrix multiplication	$O(n^{3})$
Matrix multiplication	Two $n \times n$ matrices	One $n \times n$ matrix	Strassen algorithm	$O\mathord\left(n^{2.807}\right)$
Matrix multiplication	Two $n \times n$ matrices	One $n \times n$ matrix	Coppersmith–Winograd algorithm (galactic algorithm)	$O\mathord\left(n^{2.376}\right)$
Matrix multiplication	Two $n \times n$ matrices	One $n \times n$ matrix	Optimized CW-like algorithms (galactic algorithms)	$O\mathord\left(n^{\psi=2.3728596}\right)$
Matrix multiplication	One $n \times m$ matrix, and one $m \times p$ matrix	One $n \times p$ matrix	Schoolbook matrix multiplication	$O(nmp)$
Matrix multiplication	One $n \times \left\lceil n^k \right\rceil$ matrix, and one $\left\lceil n^k \right\rceil \times n$ matrix, for some $k \geq 0$	One $n \times n$ matrix	Algorithms given in	$O(n^{\omega(k)+\epsilon})$, where upper bounds on $\omega(k)$ are given in
Matrix inversion	One $n \times n$ matrix	One $n \times n$ matrix	Gauss–Jordan elimination	$O\mathord\left(n^3\right)$
Matrix inversion	One $n \times n$ matrix	One $n \times n$ matrix	Strassen algorithm	$O\mathord\left(n^{2.807}\right)$
Matrix inversion	One $n \times n$ matrix	One $n \times n$ matrix	Coppersmith–Winograd algorithm	$O\mathord\left(n^{2.376}\right)$
Matrix inversion	One $n \times n$ matrix	One $n \times n$ matrix	Fast matrix multiplication algorithms	$O({n^\omega })$ for $~2.37 \le \omega < 3$^{, Sect. 11, pp. 413-414}.
Singular value decomposition	One $m \times n$ matrix	One $m \times m$ matrix, one $m \times n$ matrix, & one $n \times n$ matrix	Bidiagonalization and QR algorithm	$O\mathord\left(m^{2}n\right)$ ($m \geq n$)
Singular value decomposition	One $m \times n$ matrix	One $m\times n$ matrix, one $n \times n$ matrix, & one $n \times n$ matrix	Bidiagonalization and QR algorithm	$O\mathord\left(mn^{2}\right)$ ($m \leq n$)
QR decomposition	One $m \times n$ matrix	One $m \times n$ matrix, & one $n \times n$ matrix	Algorithms in by fast matrix multiplication	$O\mathord\left(mn^{1+\frac{1}{4-\omega}}\right)$ ($m \geq n$)
Determinant	One $n \times n$ matrix	One number	Laplace expansion	$O(n!)$
Determinant	One $n \times n$ matrix	One number	Division-free algorithm	$O\mathord\left(n^4\right)$ $O\mathord\left(n^{2.697263}\right)$
Determinant	One $n \times n$ matrix	One number	LU decomposition	$O(n^3)$
Determinant	One $n \times n$ matrix	One number	Bareiss algorithm	$O\mathord\left(n^3\right)$
Determinant	One $n \times n$ matrix	One number	Fast matrix multiplication	$O({n^\omega })$
Back substitution	Triangular matrix	$n$ solutions	Back substitution	$O\mathord\left(n^2\right)$
Characteristic polynomial	One $n \times n$ matrix	One degree-$n$ polynomial	Faddeev-LeVerrier algorithm	$O(n^{\psi+1})$
Characteristic polynomial	One $n \times n$ matrix	One degree-$n$ polynomial	Samuelson-Berkowitz algorithm	$O(n^{\psi+1})$ (smaller constant factor)
Characteristic polynomial	One $n \times n$ matrix	One degree-$n$ polynomial	Preparata-Sarwate algorithm	$O(n^{\psi+1/2}+n^3)$
Characteristic polynomial	One $n \times n$ matrix	One degree-$n$ polynomial	By fast matrix multiplication	$O({n^\omega })$

In 2005, Henry Cohn, Robert Kleinberg, Balázs Szegedy, and Chris Umans showed that either of two different conjectures would imply that the exponent of matrix multiplication is 2.

== Transforms ==
Algorithms for computing transforms of functions (particularly integral transforms) are widely used in all areas of mathematics, particularly analysis and signal processing.

Operation	Input	Output	Algorithm	Complexity
Discrete Fourier transform	Finite data sequence of size $n$	Set of complex numbers	Schoolbook	$O(n^2)$
Discrete Fourier transform	Finite data sequence of size $n$	Set of complex numbers	Fast Fourier transform	$O(n \log n)$
