= Characteristic function =

In mathematics, characteristic function may refer to:

- The indicator function of a subset
- Characteristic function (probability theory)
- The characteristic function of a cooperative game in game theory.
- The characteristic polynomial in linear algebra.
- The characteristic state function in statistical mechanics.
- The receiver operating characteristic in statistical decision theory.

== See also ==
- Characteristic (disambiguation)
