= Characteristic equation =

Characteristic equation may refer to:

- Characteristic equation (calculus), used to solve linear differential equations
- Characteristic equation, the equation obtained by equating to zero the characteristic polynomial of a matrix or of a linear mapping
- Method of characteristics, a technique for solving partial differential equations

== See also ==
- Characteristic (disambiguation)
