= Triple product (disambiguation) =

Triple product is a ternary operation on vectors.

It may also mean:

- Jacobi triple product, an identity in number theory
- Triple product rule, a calculus chain rule for three interdependent variables
- Lawson criterion, the product in nuclear fusion
- Triple product property, an abstract algebra identity satisfied in some groups
