= Nonlinear conjugate gradient method =

Concept in mathematics

In numerical optimization, the nonlinear conjugate gradient method generalizes the conjugate gradient method to nonlinear optimization. For a quadratic function $\displaystyle f(x)$

$$\displaystyle f(x)=\|Ax-b\|^2,$$

the minimum of $f$ is obtained when the gradient is 0:

$$\nabla_x f=2 A^T(Ax-b)=0$$.

Whereas linear conjugate gradient seeks a solution to the linear equation $\displaystyle A^T Ax=A^T b$, the nonlinear conjugate gradient method is generally used to find the local minimum of a nonlinear function using its gradient $\nabla_x f$ alone. It works when the function is approximately quadratic near the minimum, which is the case when the function is twice differentiable at the minimum and the second derivative is non-singular there.

Given a function $\displaystyle f(x)$ of $N$ variables to minimize, its gradient $\nabla_x f$ indicates the direction of maximum increase. One simply starts in the opposite (steepest descent) direction:

$$\Delta x_0=-\nabla_x f (x_0)$$

with an adjustable step length $\displaystyle \alpha$ and performs a line search in this direction until it reaches the minimum of $\displaystyle f$:

$$\displaystyle \alpha_0:= \arg \min_\alpha f(x_0+\alpha \Delta x_0)$$,
$$\displaystyle x_1=x_0+\alpha_0 \Delta x_0$$

After this first iteration in the steepest direction $\displaystyle \Delta x_0$, the following steps constitute one iteration of moving along a subsequent conjugate direction $\displaystyle s_n$, where $\displaystyle s_0=\Delta x_0$:

1. Calculate the steepest direction: $\Delta x_n=-\nabla_x f (x_n)$,
2. Compute $\displaystyle \beta_n$ according to one of the formulas below,
3. Update the conjugate direction: $\displaystyle s_n=\Delta x_n+\beta_n s_{n-1}$
4. Perform a line search: optimize $\displaystyle \alpha_n=\arg \min_{\alpha} f(x_n+\alpha s_n)$,
5. Update the position: $\displaystyle x_{n+1}=x_{n}+\alpha_{n} s_{n}$,

With a pure quadratic function the minimum is reached within N iterations (excepting roundoff error), but a non-quadratic function will make slower progress. Subsequent search directions lose conjugacy requiring the search direction to be reset to the steepest descent direction at least every N iterations, or sooner if progress stops. However, resetting every iteration turns the method into steepest descent. The algorithm stops when it finds the minimum, determined when no progress is made after a direction reset (i.e. in the steepest descent direction), or when some tolerance criterion is reached.

Within a linear approximation, the parameters $\displaystyle \alpha$ and $\displaystyle \beta$ are the same as in the linear conjugate gradient method but have been obtained with line searches. The conjugate gradient method can follow narrow (ill-conditioned) valleys, where the steepest descent method slows down and follows a criss-cross pattern.

Four of the best known formulas for $\displaystyle \beta_n$ are named after their developers:

- Fletcher–Reeves:

$$\beta_{n}^{FR} = \frac{\Delta x_n^T \Delta x_n}
{\Delta x_{n-1}^T \Delta x_{n-1}}.$$

- Polak–Ribière:

$$\beta_{n}^{PR} = \frac{\Delta x_n^T (\Delta x_n-\Delta x_{n-1})}
{\Delta x_{n-1}^T \Delta x_{n-1}}.$$

- Hestenes–Stiefel:

$$\beta_n^{HS} = \frac{\Delta x_n^T (\Delta x_n-\Delta x_{n-1})}
{-s_{n-1}^T (\Delta x_n-\Delta x_{n-1})}.$$

- Dai–Yuan:

$$\beta_{n}^{DY} = \frac{\Delta x_n^T \Delta x_n}
{-s_{n-1}^T (\Delta x_n-\Delta x_{n-1})}.$$.

These formulas are equivalent for a quadratic function, but for nonlinear optimization the preferred formula is a matter of heuristics or taste. A popular choice is $\displaystyle \beta=\max\{0, \beta^{PR}\}$, which provides a direction reset automatically.

Algorithms based on Newton's method potentially converge much faster. There, both step direction and length are computed from the gradient as the solution of a linear system of equations, with the coefficient matrix being the exact Hessian matrix (for Newton's method proper) or an estimate thereof (in the quasi-Newton methods, where the observed change in the gradient during the iterations is used to update the Hessian estimate). For high-dimensional problems, the exact computation of the Hessian is usually prohibitively expensive, and even its storage can be problematic, requiring $O(N^2)$ memory (but see the limited-memory L-BFGS quasi-Newton method).

The conjugate gradient method can also be derived using optimal control theory. In this accelerated optimization theory, the conjugate gradient method falls out as a nonlinear optimal feedback controller,

$u = k(x, \dot x):= -\gamma_a \nabla_x f(x) - \gamma_b \dot x$

for the double integrator system,

$\ddot x = u$

The quantities $\gamma_a > 0$ and $\gamma_b > 0$ are variable feedback gains.

== See also ==
- Gradient descent
- Broyden–Fletcher–Goldfarb–Shanno algorithm
- Conjugate gradient method
- L-BFGS (limited memory BFGS)
- Nelder–Mead method
- Wolfe conditions
