= Characteristic =

A characteristic is a distinguishing feature of a person or thing. It may refer to:

== Computing ==
- Characteristic (biased exponent), an ambiguous term formerly used by some authors to specify some type of exponent of a floating point number
- Characteristic (significand), an ambiguous term formerly used by some authors to specify the significand of a floating point number

== Science ==
- I–V or current–voltage characteristic, the current in a circuit as a function of the applied voltage
- Receiver operating characteristic

== Mathematics ==
- Characteristic (algebra) of a ring, the smallest common cycle length of the ring's addition operation
- Characteristic (logarithm), integer part of a common logarithm
- Characteristic function, usually the indicator function of a subset, though the term has other meanings in specific domains
- Characteristic polynomial, a polynomial associated with a square matrix in linear algebra
- Characteristic subgroup, a subgroup that is invariant under all automorphisms in group theory
- Characteristic value, another name for the eigenvalue of a matrix
- Characteristic vector (disambiguation), another name for eigenvector of a matrix
- Characteristic word, a subclass of Sturmian word
- Euler characteristic, a topological invariant
- Method of characteristics, a technique for solving partial differential equations

== Other uses ==
- Light characteristic, pattern of a lighted beacon
- Another name for ability score in Dungeons & Dragons

== See also ==
- Character (disambiguation)
- Characteristicks, a 1711 philosophical treatise by Anthony Ashley-Cooper, 3rd Earl of Shaftesbury
- Property (philosophy)
