= Erdős Lectures =

Erdős Lectures in Discrete Mathematics and Theoretical Computer Science is a distinguished lecture series at Hebrew University of Jerusalem named after mathematician Paul Erdős. It is bringing an outstanding mathematician or computer scientist to Israel every year in the Spring. The subject of the lectures is Discrete Mathematics and Theoretical Computer Science.

The first lecture series took place in 1998.

== List of Erdős Lecturers ==
- 1998: Alexander Razborov (Steklov Institute, Russia), Jeff Kahn (Rutgers University, U.S.)
- 1999: Richard Stanley (MIT, U.S.), Johan Håstad (Royal Institute of Technology, Sweden)
- 2001: Joel Spencer (NYU, U.S.)
- 2002: Madhu Sudan (NYU, U.S.)
- 2003: Maria Chudnovsky (Princeton University, U.S.)
- 2004: Imre Bárány (Alfréd Rényi Mathematical Institute, Hungary)
- 2005: János Pach (NYU, U.S.), Endre Szemerédi (Alfréd Rényi Institute of Mathematics, Hungary)
- 2006: József Beck (Princeton University, U.S.)
- 2007: Van H. Vu (Rutgers University, U.S.)
- 2008: Henry Cohn (Microsoft Research, U.S.)
- 2010: Éva Tardos (Cornell University, U.S.)
- 2011: Günter M. Ziegler (Freie Universität Berlin, Germany)
- 2012: Luca Trevisan (Stanford University, U.S.)
- 2013: Michael Saks (Rutgers University, U.S.)
- 2014: Daniel Spielman (Yale University, U.S.)
- 2015: Subhash Khot (NYU, U.S.)
- 2016: June Huh (IAS & Princeton University, U.S.)
- 2017: József Solymosi (UBC, Canada)
- 2018: Igor Pak (UCLA, U.S.)
- 2022: Shachar Lovett (UCSD, U.S.)

== See also ==
- List of things named after Paul Erdős
