= Conjugate residual method =

The conjugate residual method is an iterative numeric method used for solving systems of linear equations. It's a Krylov subspace method very similar to the much more popular conjugate gradient method, with similar construction and convergence properties.

This method is used to solve linear equations of the form

$$\mathbf A \mathbf x = \mathbf b$$

where A is an invertible and Hermitian matrix, and b is nonzero.

The conjugate residual method differs from the closely related conjugate gradient method. It involves more numerical operations and requires more storage.

Given an (arbitrary) initial estimate of the solution $\mathbf x_0$, the method is outlined below:

$$\begin{align}
& \mathbf{x}_0 := \text{Some initial guess} \\
& \mathbf{r}_0 := \mathbf{b} - \mathbf{A x}_0 \\
& \mathbf{p}_0 := \mathbf{r}_0 \\
& \text{Iterate, with } k \text{ starting at } 0:\\
& \qquad \alpha_k := \frac{\mathbf{r}_k^\mathrm{T} \mathbf{A r}_k}{(\mathbf{A p}_k)^\mathrm{T} \mathbf{A p}_k} \\
& \qquad \mathbf{x}_{k+1} := \mathbf{x}_k + \alpha_k \mathbf{p}_k \\
& \qquad \mathbf{r}_{k+1} := \mathbf{r}_k - \alpha_k \mathbf{A p}_k \\
& \qquad \beta_k := \frac{\mathbf{r}_{k+1}^\mathrm{T} \mathbf{A r}_{k+1}}{\mathbf{r}_k^\mathrm{T} \mathbf{A r}_k} \\
& \qquad \mathbf{p}_{k+1} := \mathbf{r}_{k+1} + \beta_k \mathbf{p}_k \\
& \qquad \mathbf{A p}_{k + 1} := \mathbf{A r}_{k+1} + \beta_k \mathbf{A p}_k \\
& \qquad k := k + 1
\end{align}$$

the iteration may be stopped once $\mathbf x_k$ has been deemed converged. The only difference between this and the conjugate gradient method is the calculation of $\alpha_k$ and $\beta_k$ (plus the optional incremental calculation of $\mathbf{A p}_k$ at the end).

Note: the above algorithm can be transformed so to make only one symmetric matrix-vector multiplication in each iteration.

== Preconditioning ==
By making a few substitutions and variable changes, a preconditioned conjugate residual method may be derived in the same way as done for the conjugate gradient method:

$$\begin{align}
& \mathbf x_0 := \text{Some initial guess} \\
& \mathbf r_0 := \mathbf M^{-1}(\mathbf b - \mathbf{A x}_0) \\
& \mathbf p_0 := \mathbf r_0 \\
& \text{Iterate, with } k \text{ starting at } 0: \\
& \qquad \alpha_k := \frac{\mathbf r_k^\mathrm{T} \mathbf A \mathbf r_k}{(\mathbf{A p}_k)^\mathrm{T} \mathbf M^{-1} \mathbf{A p}_k}  \\
& \qquad \mathbf x_{k+1} := \mathbf x_k + \alpha_k \mathbf{p}_k \\
& \qquad \mathbf r_{k+1} := \mathbf r_k - \alpha_k \mathbf M^{-1} \mathbf{A p}_k \\
& \qquad \beta_k := \frac{\mathbf r_{k + 1}^\mathrm{T} \mathbf A \mathbf r_{k + 1}}{\mathbf r_k^\mathrm{T} \mathbf A \mathbf r_k} \\
& \qquad \mathbf p_{k+1} := \mathbf r_{k+1} + \beta_k \mathbf{p}_k \\
& \qquad \mathbf{A p}_{k + 1} := \mathbf A \mathbf r_{k+1} + \beta_k \mathbf{A p}_k \\
& \qquad k := k + 1 \\
\end{align}$$

The preconditioner $\mathbf M^{-1}$ must be symmetric positive definite. Note that the residual vector here is different from the residual vector without preconditioning.
