= Henry Cohn =

American mathematician

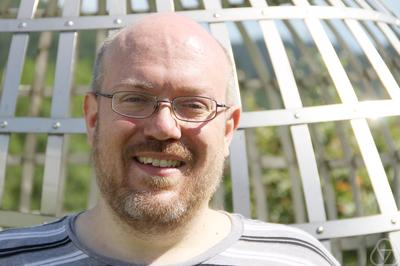
- Henry Cohn at Oberwolfach, June 2014; Photo by Ivonne Vetter
- Education: Harvard University
- Known for: Sphere packing
- Scientific career
- Fields: Mathematics
- Workplaces: Microsoft Research; Massachusetts Institute of Technology
- Thesis: New Bounds on Sphere Packings (2000)
- Doctoral advisor: Noam Elkies
- Website: https://cohn.mit.edu/

Henry Cohn is an American mathematician. He is currently a professor at MIT. Cohn graduated from Harvard University in 2000 with a doctorate in mathematics. Cohn was an Erdős Lecturer at Hebrew University of Jerusalem in 2008. In 2016, he became a Fellow of the American Mathematical Society "for contributions to discrete mathematics, including applications to computer science and physics."

In 2018, he was awarded the Levi L. Conant Prize for his article “A Conceptual Breakthrough in Sphere Packing,” published in 2017 in the Notices of the AMS.

== Research ==
In 2003, with Chris Umans, Cohn initiated a group-theoretic approach to matrix multiplication, and is a core contributor to its continued development with various coauthors.

In 2004, Cohn and Noam Elkies used linear programming methods to prove upper bounds on sphere packings in all dimensions. Their conjecture 8.1 suggested "magic" optimizing functions existed in dimensions 2, 8, and 24.

In March 2016 Maryna Viazovska published an arXiv preprint with such a magic function - a weakly holomorphic quasimodular form - proving the optimality of the E_{8} lattice packing. Cohn contacted Viazovska, and within a week, Cohn, Abhinav Kumar, Stephen D. Miller, Danylo Radchenko, and Viazovska had similarly solved the sphere packing problem in 24 dimensions via the Leech lattice Λ_{24}.
