= Characteristic vector =

A characteristic vector may refer to:

- An eigenvector
- An indicator vector
