= Samuelson–Berkowitz algorithm =

Method for matrix characteristic polynomials

In mathematics, the Samuelson–Berkowitz algorithm efficiently computes the characteristic polynomial of an $n\times n$ matrix whose entries may be elements of any unital commutative ring. Unlike the Faddeev–LeVerrier algorithm, it performs no divisions, so may be applied to a wider range of algebraic structures.

== Description of the algorithm ==
The Samuelson–Berkowitz algorithm applied to a matrix $A$ produces a vector whose entries are the coefficient of the characteristic polynomial of $A$. It computes this coefficients vector recursively as the product of a Toeplitz matrix and the coefficients vector an $(n-1)\times(n-1)$ principal submatrix.

Let $A_0$ be an $n\times n$ matrix partitioned so that

$$A_0 = \left[ \begin{array}{c|c}
a_{1,1} & R \\ \hline
C & A_1
\end{array}  \right]$$

The first principal submatrix of $A_0$ is the $(n-1)\times(n-1)$ matrix $A_1$. Associate with $A_0$ the $(n+1)\times n$ Toeplitz matrix $T_0$ defined by

$$T_0 = \left[ \begin{array}{c}
1 \\
-a_{1,1}
\end{array}  \right]$$

if $A_0$ is $1\times 1$,

$$T_0 = \left[ \begin{array}{c c}
1        & 0 \\
-a_{1,1} & 1 \\
-RC      & -a_{1,1}
\end{array} \right]$$

if $A_0$ is $2\times 2$, and in general

$$T_0 = \left[ \begin{array}{c c c c c}
1        & 0        & 0        & 0        & \cdots\\
-a_{1,1} & 1        & 0        & 0        & \cdots\\
-RC      & -a_{1,1} & 1        & 0        & \cdots\\
-RA_1C   & -RC      & -a_{1,1} & 1        & \cdots\\
-RA_1^2C & -RA_1C   & -RC      & -a_{1,1} & \cdots\\
\vdots   & \vdots   & \vdots   & \vdots   & \ddots
\end{array}  \right]$$

That is, all super diagonals of $T_0$ consist of zeros, the main diagonal consists of ones, the first subdiagonal consists of $-a_{1,1}$ and the $k$th subdiagonal consists of $-RA_1^{k-2}C$.

The algorithm is then applied recursively to $A_1$, producing the Toeplitz matrix $T_1$ times the characteristic polynomial of $A_2$, etc. Finally, the characteristic polynomial of the $1\times 1$ matrix $A_{n-1}$ is simply $T_{n-1}$. The Samuelson–Berkowitz algorithm then states that the vector $v$ defined by

$$v=T_0 T_1 T_2\cdots T_{n-1}$$

contains the coefficients of the characteristic polynomial of $A_0$.

Because each of the $T_i$ may be computed independently, the algorithm is highly parallelizable.
