= Characteristic state function =

Particular relationship between the partition function of an ensemble

The characteristic state function or Massieu's potential in statistical mechanics refers to a particular relationship between the partition function of an ensemble.

In particular, if the partition function P satisfies

$P = \exp(- \beta Q) \Leftrightarrow Q=-\frac{1}{\beta} \ln(P)$ or $P = \exp(+ \beta Q) \Leftrightarrow Q=\frac{1}{\beta} \ln(P)$

in which Q is a thermodynamic quantity, then Q is known as the "characteristic state function" of the ensemble corresponding to "P". Beta refers to the thermodynamic beta.

== Examples ==
- The microcanonical ensemble satisfies $\Omega(U,V,N) = e^{ \beta T S} \;\,$ hence, its characteristic state function is $TS$.
- The canonical ensemble satisfies $Z(T,V,N) = e^{- \beta A} \,\;$ hence, its characteristic state function is the Helmholtz free energy $A$.
- The grand canonical ensemble satisfies $\mathcal Z(T,V,\mu) = e^{-\beta \Phi} \,\;$, so its characteristic state function is the Grand potential $\Phi$.
- The isothermal-isobaric ensemble satisfies $\Delta(N,T,P) = e^{-\beta G} \;\,$ so its characteristic function is the Gibbs free energy $G$.

State functions are those which tell about the equilibrium state of a system
