= Double integrator =

Second-order control system

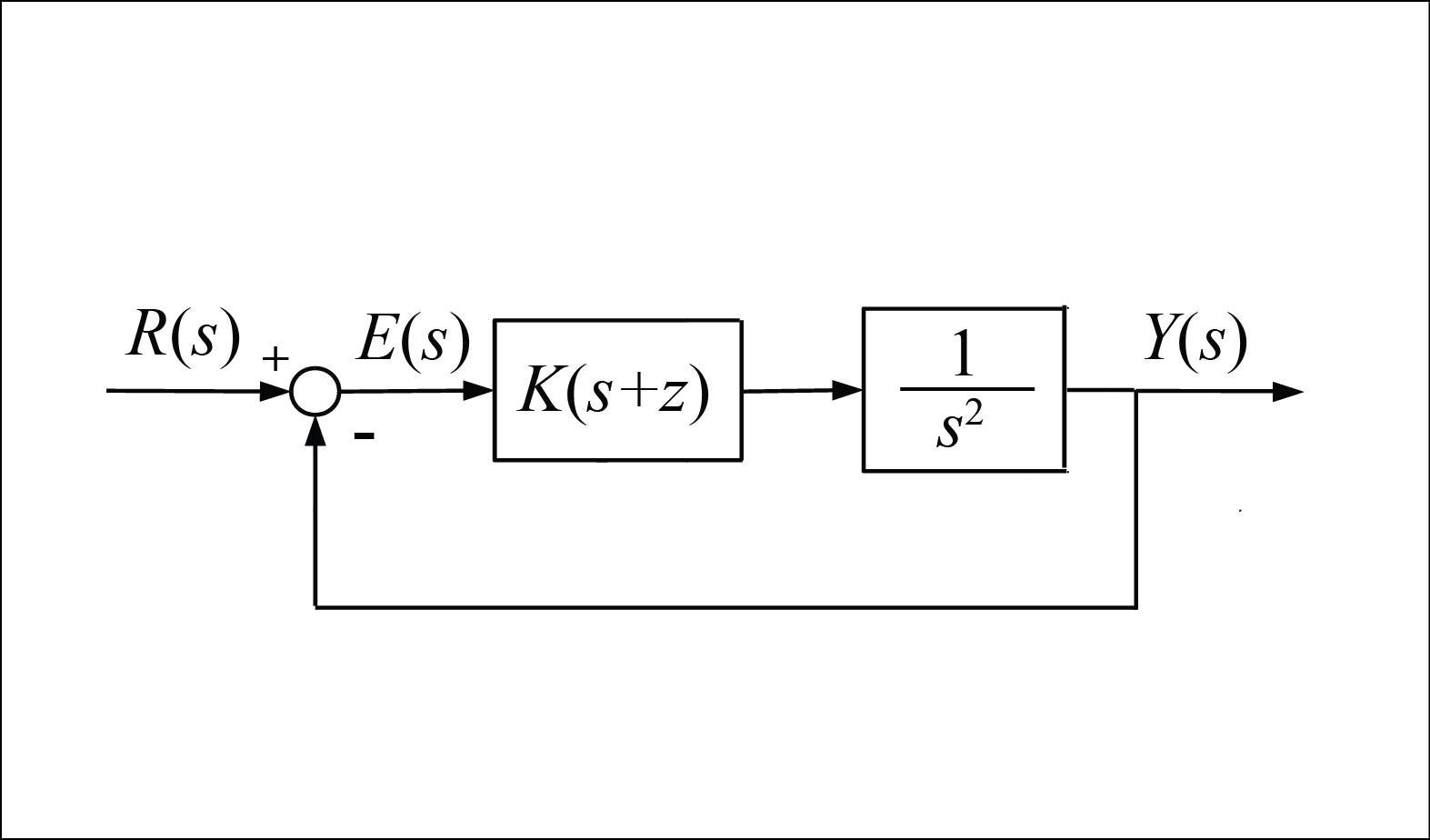
Feedback system with a PD controller and a double integrator plant

In systems and control theory, the double integrator is a canonical example of a second-order control system. It models the dynamics of a simple mass in one-dimensional space under the effect of a time-varying force input $\textbf{u}$.

== Differential equations ==
The differential equations which represent a double integrator are:

$$\ddot{q} = u(t)$$
$$y = q(t)$$

where both $q(t), u(t) \in \mathbb{R}$. Let us now represent this in state space form with the vector
$$\textbf{x(t)} = \begin{bmatrix}
q\\
\dot{q}\\
\end{bmatrix}$$

$$\dot{\textbf{x}}(t)= \frac{d\textbf{x}}{dt} = \begin{bmatrix}
\dot{q}\\
\ddot{q}\\
\end{bmatrix}$$

In this representation, it is clear that the control input $\textbf{u}$ is the second derivative of the output $\textbf{x}$. In the scalar form, the control input is the second derivative of the output $q$.

== State space representation ==
The normalized state space model of a double integrator takes the form

$$\dot{\textbf{x}}(t) = \begin{bmatrix}
0& 1\\
0& 0\\
\end{bmatrix}\textbf{x}(t) +
\begin{bmatrix} 0\\ 1\end{bmatrix}\textbf{u}(t)$$
$$\textbf{y}(t) = \begin{bmatrix} 1& 0\end{bmatrix}\textbf{x}(t).$$

According to this model, the input $\textbf{u}$ is the second derivative of the output $\textbf{y}$, hence the name double integrator.

== Transfer function representation ==
Taking the Laplace transform of the state space input-output equation, we see that the transfer function of the double integrator is given by

$$\frac{Y(s)}{U(s)} = \frac{1}{s^2}.$$

Using the differential equations dependent on $q(t), y(t), u(t)$ and $\textbf{x(t)}$, and the state space representation:
