= Triple product property =

In abstract algebra, the triple product property (TPP) is an identity satisfied in some groups that describes certain disjointness conditions for triples of non-empty subsets of the groups.

The TPP is a key concept in the study of group-theoretic fast matrix multiplication algorithms.

Triples satisfying the TPP have also been studied in the setting of finite groups for their group-theoretic and combinatorial properties and relations.

== Definitions ==
This is the standard, original definition. Let $G$ be a non-trivial group, not necessarily finite. Three nonempty subsets $S, T, U \subseteq G$ are said to satisfy the triple product property in $G$ if for all elements $s, s' \in S$, $t, t' \in T$, $u, u' \in U$ it is the case that

$$s's^{-1}t't^{-1}u'u^{-1} = 1 \Rightarrow s' = s, t' = t, u' = u$$

where $1$ is the identity of $G$.

An equivalent set-theoretic characterisation of this definition, for the subsets $S, T, U$ with respect to $G$, is:

$$Q(S) \cap Q(T) = Q(S)Q(T) \cap Q(U) = \{1\}$$

where $Q(X)$ is called the right-quotient set of a non-empty subset $X \subseteq G$ and defined as:

$$Q(X) := \{x'x^{-1} \mid x, x' \in X\}.$$

The member triple $(S, T, U)$ is said to be a TPP triple of $G$with parameters (or of parameter type) $(|S|, |T|, |U|)$ and to have the size $|S||T||U|$.

If $S, T, U$ are subgroups of $G$ satisfying the TPP then the equational definition above simplifies to:

$$stu = 1 \Rightarrow s = t = u = 1$$

for elements $s \in S, t \in T, u \in U$, and the set-theoretic characterisation simplifies to:

$$S \cap T = ST \cap U = \{1\}.$$

as $Q(S) = S$, $Q(T) = T$, $Q(U) = U$.

== Properties ==
Two basic invariance properties of TPP triples of a group $G$ are:

1. Permutation invariance. If $(S, T, U)$ is a TPP triple then so are the triples

$$(S^\pi, T^\pi, U^\pi)$$

for permutations $\pi \in \text{Sym}(3)$.

2. Translation invariance. If $(S, T, U)$ is a TPP triple then so are the triples

$$(dSa, dTb, dUc)$$

for elements $d, a, b, c \in G$.

Translation invariance means that any TPP triple $(S, T, U)$ of $G$ is translation equivalent to the TPP triple

$$(S' = Ss^{-1}, T' = Tt^{-1}, U' = Uu^{-1})$$

where $s \in S$, $t \in T$, $u \in U$ are non-identity elements. This translated triple $(S', T', U')$ has the nice property that

$$1 \in S \cap T \cap U$$

and is for that reason called basic. TPP triples of subgroups are necessarily basic. Translation invariance means that any TPP triple can be translated to a basic TPP triple, which happens to have the same parameter type and size as the original. In any given group this condition considerably reduces the search space of 'candidate" TPP triples, particularly when it comes to computational search algorithms.

== Combinatorial Constraints and Bounds ==
In the setting of finite groups, the parameters $|S|, |T|, |U|$ of a (basic) TPP triple $(S, T, U)$ of a (finite) group $G$ satisfy the inequalities:

$$|S^\pi|(|T^\pi| + |U^\pi| - 1) \leq |G|$$

where $\pi \in \text{Sym}(3)$, from which a sharp upper bound can be derived for the quantity $|S||T||U|$:

$$|S||T||U| \leq \left( \frac{1 + \sqrt{1 + 8|G|}}{4}  \right)^3 \leq  \frac{1}{2\sqrt{2}}|G|^{\frac{3}{2}} + O(n).$$

The smallest group that achieves this upper bound is the dihedral group $D_6$ (and the symmetric group $\text{Sym}(3)$) of order $6$ via a TPP triple of subgroups of type $(2, 2, 2)$ and size $2^3 = 8$. The bound is an improvement on an earlier bound $|S||T||U| < |G|^{\frac{3}{2}}$.

If $\text{TPP}'(G)$ denotes the collection of all basic TPP triples of $G$ and the TPP ratio of $G$, $\rho(G)$, is defined as:

$$\rho(G) := \max_{(S, T, U) \in \text{TPP}'(G)} \frac{|S||T||U|}{|G|}$$

then

$$1 \leq \rho(G) \leq \frac{\left(1 + \sqrt{1+8|G|}\right)^3}{64|G|} \sim \frac{1}{2\sqrt{2}}\sqrt{|G|} + \frac{3}{8}$$

where the lower bound $\rho(G) \geq 1$ comes from the fact that $G$ always realises the trivial TPP triple $(G, \{1\}, \{1\})$. If $\text{TPP}_0(G) \subseteq \text{TPP}'(G)$ denotes the subcollection of all TPP triples of $G$ composed of subgroups and the subgroup TPP ratio of $G$, $\rho_0(G)$, is defined as:

$$\rho_0(G) := \max_{(S, T, U) \in \text{TPP}_0(G)} \frac{|S||T||U|}{|G|}$$

then

$$1 \leq \rho_0(G) \leq \rho(G).$$

=== Upper Bounds for $\rho$ and $\rho_0$ for Families of Groups ===
The earliest studies of bounds related to the TPP ratio $\rho$ and subgroup TPP ratio $\rho_0$ were focused on upper bounds for certain parameters (pseudoexponents) describing the efficiency of realising matrix multiplication in various families of finite groups. Studies of $\rho$ and $\rho_0$ as combinatorial problems in finite groups, in their own right, independent of applications for matrix multiplication, began with P. M. Neumann.

More recent studies of the subgroup TPP ratio $\rho_0$, using the combinatorial approach, have yielded some results for finite groups with large abelian subgroups, to be precise, that:

$$\rho_0(G) \leq \frac{p^2}{2p - 1}$$

if $G$ is a finite group with an abelian normal subgroup of prime index $p$; that

$$\rho_0(G) \leq \frac{1}{2}p$$

if $G$ is a finite group with an abelian normal subgroup of prime index $p$ such that $2p - 1$ does not divide $|G|$; and that:

$$\rho_0(G) = 1$$

if $G$ is a finite $p$-group with an abelian (and necessarily normal) subgroup of index $p$. In relation to the more general TPP ratio there is a conjecture that

$$\rho(G) \leq \frac{p^2}{2p - 1}$$

if $G$ is a group with a cyclic normal subgroup of prime index $p$.
