= Sparse matrix–vector multiplication =

Computation routine

Sparse matrix–vector multiplication (SpMV) of the form y = Ax is a widely used computational kernel existing in many scientific applications. The input matrix A is sparse. The input vector x and the output vector y are dense. In the case of a repeated y = Ax operation involving the same input matrix A but possibly changing numerical values of its elements, A can be preprocessed to reduce both the parallel and sequential run time of the SpMV kernel.

== See also ==
- Matrix–vector multiplication
- General-purpose computing on graphics processing units § Kernels
