= Chris Umans =

Christopher Umans
- Education: Williams College, University of California, Berkeley
- Known for: Computational complexity, algorithms, hardness of approximation, matrix multiplication
- Scientific career
- Fields: Computer Science
- Workplaces: California Institute of Technology
- Doctoral advisor: Christos Papadimitriou

Christopher Umans is a professor of computer science in the Computing and Mathematical Sciences Department at the California Institute of Technology. He is known for work on algorithms, computational complexity, algebraic complexity, and hardness of approximation.

== Academic biography ==
Umans studied at Williams College, where he completed a BA degree in Mathematics and Computer Science in 1996. He then received a PhD in Computer Science from University of California, Berkeley in 2000 under Christos Papadimitriou. Following his PhD, he was a postdoctoral researcher at Microsoft Research until joining Caltech in 2002.

== Research ==
Umans' research centers broadly around algorithms and complexity. He has made notable contributions to varied areas within this space including random number generation, expanders, and algorithms for matrix multiplication. A notable example is his work on developing a group theoretic approach for matrix multiplication.

In 2008, Umans and his student Dave Buchfuhrer settled a 1979 conjecture on the complexity of unbounded Boolean formula minimization; the result won a best paper award at ICALP.

== Awards and honors ==
Umans received an NSF CAREER award in 2004 and an Alfred P. Sloan Fellowship in 2005. Additionally, his work has received "Best Paper" awards at the International Conference on Automata, Languages, and Programming (ICALP) and the IEEE Conference on Computational Complexity (CCC).
