= Exponential hierarchy =

In computational complexity theory, the exponential hierarchy is a hierarchy of complexity classes that is an exponential time analogue of the polynomial hierarchy. As elsewhere in complexity theory, “exponential” is used with two different meanings (linear exponential bounds $2^{cn}$ for a constant c, and full exponential bounds $2^{n^c}$), leading to two versions of the exponential hierarchy. These hierarchies are sometimes also referred to as the weak exponential hierarchies, to differentiate them from the strong exponential hierarchy, which contains both of the weak hierarchies.

== EH ==
The complexity class EH is the union of the classes $\Sigma^\mathsf{E}_k$ for all k, where $\Sigma^\mathsf{E}_0 = \mathsf{E}$ and $\Sigma^\mathsf{E}_k=\mathsf{NE}^{\Sigma^\mathsf{P}_{k-1}}$ (i.e., languages computable in nondeterministic time $2^{cn}$ for some constant c with a $\Sigma^\mathsf{P}_{k-1}$ oracle). One also defines

$\Pi^\mathsf{E}_k=\mathsf{coNE}^{\Sigma^\mathsf{P}_{k-1}}$ and $\Delta^\mathsf{E}_k=\mathsf{E}^{\Sigma^\mathsf{P}_{k-1}}.$

An equivalent definition is that a language L is in $\Sigma^\mathsf{E}_k$ if and only if it can be written in the form

$$x\in L\iff\exists y_1\forall y_2\dots Qy_k R(x,y_1,\ldots,y_k),$$

where $R(x,y_1,\ldots,y_n)$ is a predicate computable in time $2^{c|x|}$ (which implicitly bounds the length of y_{i}). Also equivalently, EH is the class of languages computable on an alternating Turing machine in time $2^{cn}$ for some c with constantly many alternations.

== EXPH ==
EXPH is the union of the classes $\Sigma^{\mathsf{EXP}}_k$, where $\Sigma^{\mathsf{EXP}}_k=\mathsf{NEXP}^{\Sigma^\mathsf{P}_{k-1}}$ (languages computable in nondeterministic time $2^{n^c}$ for some constant c with a $\Sigma^\mathsf{P}_{k-1}$ oracle), $\Sigma^{\mathsf{EXP}}_0 = \mathsf{EXP}$, and again:

$$\Pi^{\mathsf{EXP}}_k=\mathsf{coNEXP}^{\Sigma^\mathsf{P}_{k-1}}, \Delta^{\mathsf{EXP}}_k=\mathsf{EXP}^{\Sigma^\mathsf{P}_{k-1}}.$$

A language L is in $\Sigma^{\mathsf{EXP}}_k$ if and only if it can be written as

$$x\in L\iff\exists y_1 \forall y_2 \dots Qy_k R(x,y_1,\ldots,y_k),$$

where $R(x,y_1,\ldots,y_k)$ is computable in time $2^{|x|^c}$ for some c, which again implicitly bounds the length of y_{i}. Equivalently, EXPH is the class of languages computable in time $2^{n^c}$ on an alternating Turing machine with constantly many alternations.

== The strong exponential hierarchy ==
The strong exponential hierarchy, denoted SEH, is the union of NE, NP^{NE}, NP^{NP^{NE}}, and so on.

The same class is obtained if we replace NE by NEXP.

== Comparison ==
E ⊆ NE ⊆ EH⊆ ESPACE,
EXP ⊆ NEXP ⊆ EXPH⊆ EXPSPACE,
EH ⊆ EXPH.
