= Bob Hearn =

American ultramarathoner and computer scientist

Robert Aubrey Hearn is an American ultramarathon runner, computer scientist, and recreational mathematician.

== Computer science and recreational mathematics ==
Hearn is originally from Oklahoma; as a student at Memorial High School (Tulsa, Oklahoma) in the early 1980s, he was passionate about solving the Rubik's Cube. He is a 1987 alumnus of Rice University; at Rice, he was a member of the Marching Owl Band and of Rice's third-place-winning team in the 1986 International Collegiate Programming Contest.

Hearn was hired from Rice by StyleWare, a developer of Apple II software. With another Rice student and ICPC contestant, Jeff Erickson, he wrote TopDraw, a black-and-white bitmap drawing program that was purchased by Beagle Bros and became BeagleDraw. StyleWare was purchased by Claris, and with Scott Holdaway, Hearn became one of the two original developers of ClarisWorks, a popular integrated office suite for Apple Macintosh computers. He, Holdaway, and several other ClarisWorks developers founded Gobe Software in 1997.

He later became a doctoral student of Erik Demaine at the Massachusetts Institute of Technology, co-advised by Gerald Jay Sussman. His 2006 dissertation invented nondeterministic constraint logic and used it to characterize the computational complexity of many games, puzzles, and reconfiguration problems. He and Demaine turned his dissertation into the 2009 book Games, Puzzles, and Computation.

He is a member of the board of directors for Gathering 4 Gardner.

== Running ==
Hearn first began competing in ultra-marathons when he was 42, and has set many US records for his age classes. He was honored in 2022 by a Tennessee House of Representatives Bill that named him "King of the Road" for winning the 2021 Last Annual Vol State Road Race, a 500 km (310 mi) race, of which 468 km (291 mi) passed through Tennessee. In 2023, USA Track & Field named him as their male masters ultrarunner of the year.
