= Double exponential =

Double exponential may refer to:

- A double exponential function
  - Double exponential time, a task with time complexity roughly proportional to such a function
  - 2-EXPTIME, the complexity class of decision problems solvable in double-exponential time by a deterministic Turing machine.
- Double exponential distribution, which may refer to:
  - Laplace distribution, a bilateral exponential distribution
  - Gumbel distribution, an iterated exponential distribution
- Double exponential integration, most commonly tanh–sinh quadrature
- Double exponential smoothing
