= Shannon number =

Estimate of number of possible chess games

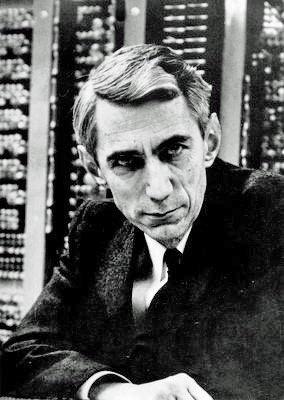
Claude Shannon

The Shannon number, named after the American mathematician Claude Shannon, is a conservative lower bound of the game-tree complexity of chess of 10^{120}, based on an average of about 10^{3} possibilities for a pair of moves consisting of a move for White followed by a move for Black, and a typical game lasting about 40 such pairs of moves. His influential 1950 paper on it, "Programming a Computer for Playing Chess", introduced the field of computer chess.

== Shannon's calculation ==
Shannon showed a calculation for the lower bound of the game-tree complexity of chess, resulting in about 10^{120} possible games, to demonstrate the impracticality of solving chess by brute force.

Shannon also estimated the number of possible positions, of the general order of 63^{31} (8!)^{−2} (where the ! represents the factorial and the underlined superscript represents a falling factorial), or roughly 3.7×10^{34}. This includes some illegal positions (e.g., pawns on the first rank, both kings in check) and excludes legal positions following captures and promotions.

Number of plies (half-moves)	Number of possible games	Number of possible positions	Number of checkmates
1	20	20	0
2	400	400	0
3	8,902	5,362	0
4	197,281	72,078	8
5	4,865,609	822,518	347
6	119,060,324	9,417,681	10,828
7	3,195,901,860	96,400,068	435,767
8	84,998,978,956	988,187,354	9,852,036
9	2,439,530,234,167	9,183,421,888	400,191,963
10	69,352,859,712,417	85,375,278,064	8,790,619,155
11	2,097,651,003,696,806	726,155,461,002	362,290,010,907
12	62,854,969,236,701,747		8,361,091,858,959
13	1,981,066,775,000,396,239		346,742,245,764,219
14	61,885,021,521,585,529,237		
15	2,015,099,950,053,364,471,960		

After each player has moved a piece 5 times each (10 ply) there are 69,352,859,712,417 possible games that could have been played.

== Tighter bounds ==
=== Upper, positions ===
Taking Shannon's numbers into account, Victor Allis calculated an upper bound of 5×10^{52} for the number of positions, and estimated the true number to be about 10^{50}. Later work proved an upper bound of 8.7×10^{45}, and showed an upper bound 4×10^{37} in the absence of promotions.

=== Accurate, positions ===
John Tromp and Peter Österlund estimated the number of legal chess positions with a 95% confidence level at (4.822±0.028)×10^{44}, based on an efficiently computable bijection between integers and chess positions.

=== Lower, complexity ===
Allis also estimated the game-tree complexity to be at least 10^{123}, "based on an average branching factor of 35 and an average game length of 80". As a comparison, the number of atoms in the observable universe, to which it is often compared, is roughly estimated to be 10^{80}.

== Number of sensible chess games ==
As a comparison to the Shannon number, if chess is analyzed for the number of "sensible" games that can be played (i.e., not counting ridiculous or obvious game-losing moves such as moving a queen to be immediately captured by a pawn without compensation), then the result is closer to around 10^{40} games. This is based on having a choice of about three sensible moves at each ply (half-move), and a game length of 80 plies (or, equivalently, 40 moves).

== See also ==
- Combinatorial explosion
- Game complexity
- Go and mathematics
- Solving chess
