= Formula game =

A formula game is an artificial game represented by a fully quantified Boolean formula such as $\exists x_1 \forall x_2 \exists x_3 \ldots \psi$.

One player (E) has the goal of choosing values so as to make the formula $\psi$ true, and selects values for the variables that are existentially quantified with $\exists$. The opposing player (A) has the goal of making the formula $\psi$ false, and selects values for the variables that are universally quantified with $\forall$. The players take turns according to the order of the quantifiers, each assigning a value to the next bound variable in the original formula. Once all variables have been assigned values, Player E wins if the resulting expression is true.

In computational complexity theory, the language FORMULA-GAME is defined as all formulas $\Phi$ such that Player E has a winning strategy in the game represented by $\Phi$. FORMULA-GAME is PSPACE-complete because it is exactly the same decision problem as True quantified Boolean formula. Player E has a winning strategy exactly when every choice they must make in a game has a truth assignment that makes $\psi$ true, no matter what choice Player A makes.
