= Blocked (video game) =

2009 video game

- Developer: Joel Rosenberg
- Platforms: iPhone, iPod Touch

Blocked is a 2009 puzzle game for the iPhone and iPod Touch made by Joel Rosenberg.

== Development ==
The game was based on the puzzle game Rush Hour.

== Game description ==
The player maneuvers around gray blocks until a blue rock can escape. Blocks can only move left and right or up and down. The game has 100 challenges in 20 levels: easy, medium, hard, harder, and hardest.

== Reception ==
James Savage of Macworld noted that Blocked is the perfect puzzle game for those quick moments during the day when you've got some time to kill and need a puzzle to solve. Lew Reed of Slide To Play pointed to the game's simplicity as being crucial to its success.
