= E (complexity) =

Computational complexity class

In computational complexity theory, the complexity class E is the set of decision problems that can be solved by a deterministic Turing machine in time 2^{O(n)} and is therefore equal to the complexity class DTIME(2^{O(n)}).

E, unlike the similar class EXPTIME, is not closed under polynomial-time many-one reductions.

== Relationship to other classes ==
E is contained in NE, as E is the deterministic-time analogue of the nondeterministic class NE.
