= NE (complexity) =

Computational complexity class

In computational complexity theory, the complexity class NE is the set of decision problems that can be solved by a non-deterministic Turing machine in time $2^{O(n)}$. It is similar to NEXPTIME, the set of decision problems that can be solved by a non-deterministic Turing machine in time $2^{n^{O(1)}}$. By definition, it is contained in NEXPTIME.

NE, unlike NEXPTIME, is not closed under polynomial-time many-one reductions.

== See also ==
- E (complexity)
