= Circuit =

Circuit may refer to:

== Science and technology ==
=== Electrical engineering ===
- Electrical circuit, a complete electrical network with a closed-loop giving a return path for current
  - Analog circuit, uses continuous signal levels
  - Balanced circuit, paths are impedance-matched
  - Circuit analysis, the process of finding the voltages across, and the currents through, every component in an electrical circuit
  - Circuit diagram, a graphical representation of an electrical circuit
  - Digital circuit, uses discrete signal levels
  - Electronic circuit, contains "active" (nonlinear) electronic components capable of performing amplification, computation, and data transfer
    - Asynchronous circuit, or self-timed circuit, a sequential digital logic circuit that is not governed by a clock circuit or global clock signal
    - Integrated circuit, a set of electronic circuits on a small "chip" of semiconductor material
      - Mixed-signal integrated circuit, contains both analog and digital signals
    - Synchronous circuit, a digital circuit in which the changes in the state of memory elements are synchronized by a clock signal
  - Printed circuit board, on which electronic components are supported and connected using copper tracks on a non-conductive substrate
  - Series and parallel circuits, two ways in which electrical components may be interconnected
  - Simple filters, including:
    - LC circuit or tank circuit, consisting of an inductance and a capacitance
    - RC circuit, comprises a resistance and a capacitance
    - RL circuit, comprises a resistance and an inductance
    - RLC circuit, comprises a resistance, an inductance, and a capacitance
  - Telecommunication circuit, on which information is transmitted
  - Nonlinear circuit, a circuit with nonlinear elements.

=== Mathematics and computer science ===
- Circuit (computer theory), a theoretical structure simulating electrical and data paths
  - Boolean circuit, a mathematical model for digital logic circuits
  - Integer circuit, a mathematical object of computational complexity
- Circuit complexity, a branch of computational complexity theory
- Cycle (graph theory), a closed path, with no other repeated vertices than the starting and ending vertices
- Circuit of a matroid
- Circuit (neural network), a computational subgraph within an artificial neural network that performs a specific, interpretable function

=== Other sciences ===
- Neural circuit, in neuroscience
- Hydraulic circuit, in fluid mechanics
- Magnetic circuit, in physics, one or more closed loop paths containing a magnetic flux
- Monetary circuit theory, a heterodox theory of monetary economics, also called circuitism
- Pneumatic circuit, in fluid mechanics
- Synthetic biological circuit, in synthetic biology

== Arts, entertainment, and media ==
- Circuit (film), a 2001 gay-themed film set in the world of gay circuit parties
- Mario Kart: Super Circuit, a 2001 Game Boy Advance game and the third game in the Mario Kart series
- Circuit (film character), a character from the Indian film series Munna Bhai
- Circuit, a character from Power Rangers Time Force
- Circuitt, a 2023 Indian Marathi-language action thriller film starring Vaibhav Tatwawadi and Hruta Durgule in lead roles

== Church ==
- Circuit (LCMS), a local grouping of congregations in the Lutheran Church–Missouri Synod
- Methodist Circuit, a form of church governance in Methodism

== Government and law ==
- Circuit (administrative division), an administrative country subdivision in East Asia
- Circuit court, the name of court systems in several common law jurisdictions

== Sports ==
- Circuit training, a form of high-intensity aerobics
- ITF Pro Circuit, pro tennis tours of the International Tennis Federation
  - ITF Men's Circuit
  - ITF Women's Circuit

== Transportation and racing ==
- Circuit (airfield), also called pattern, a standard path followed by aircraft when taking off or landing
- Circuit, a race track or one complete traverse of a track
  - Formula One circuits (see list of Formula One circuits)
  - Kart circuit, a race track designed for kart racing

== Other uses ==
- Circuit (software), a collaboration service software by Unify
- Circuit, slang for hangouts or events frequented by a given social circle
- Circuit party, a gay dance event

== See also ==
- Circuital, a 2011 album by My Morning Jacket
- Cirkut
- The Circuit (disambiguation)
