= Bella Subbotovskaya =

Russian mathematician

Bella Abramovna Subbotovskaya
- Белла Абрамовна Субботовская
- Subbotovskaya in 1961
- Born: December 17, 1937; Moscow, Russia
- Died: November 23, 1982 (aged 44)
- Cause of death: Car crash (suspected assassination)
- Resting place: Vostryakovo Jewish Cemetery, Moscow
- Education: Faculty of Mechanics and Mathematics, Moscow State University
- Known for: Boolean formula complexity Jewish People's University
- Spouse: Ilya Muchnik (m. 1961–1971)
- Scientific career
- Fields: Mathematical logic Mathematics education
- Thesis: "A criterion for the comparability of bases for the realisation of Boolean functions by formulas" (1963)
- Academic advisors: Oleg Lupanov

Bella Abramovna Subbotovskaya (17 December 1937 – 23 September 1982) was a Soviet mathematician who founded the short-lived Jewish People's University (1978–1983) in Moscow. The school's purpose was to offer free education to those affected by structured anti-Semitism within the Soviet educational system. Its existence was outside Soviet authority and it was investigated by the KGB. Subbotovskaya herself was interrogated a number of times by the KGB and shortly thereafter was hit by a truck and died, in what has been speculated was an assassination.

== Academic work ==
Prior to founding the Jewish People's University, Subbotovskaya published papers in mathematical logic. Her results on Boolean formulas written in terms of $\land$, $\lor$, and $\lnot$ were influential in the then nascent field of computational complexity theory.

=== Random restrictions ===
Subbotovskaya invented the method of random restrictions to Boolean functions. Starting with a function $f$, a restriction $\rho$ of $f$ is a partial assignment to $n-k$ of the $n$ variables, giving a function $f_\rho$ of fewer variables. Take the following function:

$$f(x_1, x_2, x_3) = (x_1 \lor x_2 \lor x_3) \land (\lnot x_1 \lor x_2) \land (x_1 \lor \lnot x_3)$$.

The following is a restriction of one variable

$$f_\rho(y_1, y_2) = f(1, y_1, y_2) = (1 \lor y_1 \lor y_2) \land (\lnot 1 \lor y_1) \land (1 \lor \lnot y_2)$$.

Under the usual identities of Boolean algebra this simplifies to $f_\rho(y_1, y_2) = y_1$.

To sample a random restriction, retain $k$ variables uniformly at random. For each remaining variable, assign it 0 or 1 with equal probability.

=== Formula Size and Restrictions ===
As demonstrated in the above example, applying a restriction to a function can massively reduce the size of its formula. Though $f$ is written with 7 variables, by only restricting one variable, we found that $f_\rho$ uses only 1.

Subbotovskaya proved something much stronger: if $\rho$ is a random restriction of $n-k$ variables, then the expected shrinkage between $f$ and $f_\rho$ is large, specifically

$$\mathbb{E} \left [ L(f_\rho) \right ] \le \left ( \frac k n \right )^{3/2} L(f)$$,

where $L$ is the minimum number of variables in the formula. Applying Markov's inequality we see

$$\Pr \left [ L(f_\rho) \le 4 \left ( \frac k n \right )^{3/2} L(f) \right ] \ge \frac 3 4$$.

=== Example application ===
Take $f$ to be the parity function over $n$ variables. After applying a random restriction of $n-1$ variables, we know that $f_\rho$ is either $x_i$ or $\lnot x_i$ depending the parity of the assignments to the remaining variables. Thus clearly the size of the circuit that computes $f_\rho$ is exactly 1. Then applying the probabilistic method, for sufficiently large $n$, we know there is some $\rho$ for which

$$L(f_\rho) \le 4 \left ( \frac 1 {n} \right )^{3/2} L(f)$$.

Plugging in $L(f_\rho) = 1$, we see that $L(f) \ge n^{3/2}/4$. Thus we have proven that the smallest circuit to compute the parity of $n$ variables using only $\land, \lor, \lnot$ must use at least this many variables.

=== Influence ===
Although this is not an exceptionally strong lower bound, random restrictions have become an essential tool in complexity. In a similar vein to this proof, the exponent $3/2$ in the main lemma has been increased through careful analysis to $1.63$ by Paterson and Zwick (1993) and then to $2$ by Håstad (1998). Additionally, Håstad's Switching lemma (1987) applied the same technique to the much richer model of constant depth Boolean circuits.
