= ACC0 =

Class of models and problems in circuit complexity

Sketch of an ACC-circuit: For a fixed number m, the circuit consists of NOT-, AND-, OR-, and (Mod m)-Gates. The fan-in of each gate is bounded by a polynomial and the depth of the circuit is bounded by a constant.

ACC^{0}, sometimes called ACC, is a class of computational models and problems defined in circuit complexity, a field of theoretical computer science. The class is defined by augmenting the class AC^{0} of constant-depth "alternating circuits" with the ability to count; the acronym ACC stands for "AC with counters". Specifically, a problem belongs to ACC^{0} if it can be solved by polynomial-size, constant-depth circuits of unbounded fan-in gates, including gates that count modulo a fixed integer. ACC^{0} corresponds to computation in any solvable monoid. The class is very well studied in theoretical computer science because of the algebraic connections and because it is one of the largest concrete computational models for which computational impossibility results, so-called circuit lower bounds, can be proved.

== Definitions ==
Informally, ACC^{0} models the class of computations realised by Boolean circuits of constant depth and polynomial size, where the circuit gates includes "modular counting gates" that compute the number of true inputs modulo some fixed constant.

More formally, a language belongs to AC^{0}[m] if it can be computed by a family of circuits C_{1}, C_{2}, ..., where C_{n} takes n inputs, the depth of every circuit is constant, the size of C_{n} is a polynomial function of n, and the circuit uses the following gates: AND gates and OR gates of unbounded fan-in, computing the conjunction and disjunction of their inputs; NOT gates computing the negation of their single input; and unbounded fan-in MOD-m gates, which compute 1 if the number of input 1s is a multiple of m. A language belongs to ACC^{0} if it belongs to AC^{0}[m] for some m.

In some texts, ACC^{i} refers to a hierarchy of circuit classes with ACC^{0} at its lowest level, where the circuits in ACC^{i} have depth O(log^{i}n) and polynomial size.

The class ACC^{0} can also be defined in terms of computations of nonuniform deterministic finite automata (NUDFA) over monoids. In this framework, the input is interpreted as elements from a fixed monoid, and the input is accepted if the product of the input elements belongs to a given list of monoid elements. The class ACC^{0} is the family of languages accepted by a NUDFA over some monoid that does not contain an unsolvable group as a subsemigroup.

== Computational power ==
The class ACC^{0} includes AC^{0}. This inclusion is strict, because a single MOD-2 gate computes the parity function, which is known to be impossible to compute in AC^{0}. More generally, the function MOD_{m} cannot be computed in AC^{0}[p] for prime p unless m is a power of p.

The class ACC^{0} is included in TC^{0}. It is conjectured that ACC^{0} is unable to compute the majority function of its inputs (i.e. the inclusion in TC^{0} is strict), but this remains unresolved as of July 2018.

Every problem in ACC^{0} can be solved by circuits of depth 2, with AND gates of polylogarithmic fan-in at the inputs, connected to a single gate computing some symmetric (not depending on the order of the inputs) function. These circuits are called SYM^{+}-circuits. The proof follows ideas of the proof of Toda's theorem.

Williams (2011) proves that ACC^{0} does not contain NEXPTIME. The proof uses many results in complexity theory, including the time hierarchy theorem, IP = PSPACE, derandomization, and the representation of ACC^{0} via SYM^{+} circuits. Murray & Williams (2018) improves this bound and proves that ACC^{0} does not contain NQP (nondeterministic quasipolynomial time).

It is known that computing the permanent is impossible for LOGTIME-uniform ACC^{0} circuits, which implies that the complexity class PP is not contained in LOGTIME-uniform ACC^{0}.
