= Circuit value problem =

Computational problem

An example Boolean circuit

The circuit value problem (or circuit evaluation problem) is the computational problem of computing the output of a given Boolean circuit on a given input.

The problem is complete for P under uniform AC^{0} reductions. Note that, in terms of time complexity, it can be solved in linear time simply by a topological sort.

The Boolean formula value problem (or Boolean formula evaluation problem) is the special case of the problem when the circuit is a tree. The Boolean formula value problem is complete for NC^{1} with respect to AC^{0} reductions.

The problem is closely related to the Boolean satisfiability problem which is complete for NP and its complement, the propositional tautology problem, which is complete for co-NP.

== See also ==
- Circuit satisfiability
- Switching lemma
