= Universal state =

Universal state may refer to

- Universal state (Toynbee), as used in reference to A Study of History, a work by historian Toynbee.
- Universal state (Turing), a concept in the study of computational complexity
