= Jewish People's University =

The Jewish People's University was an unofficial semi-underground mathematical course in Moscow in 1978–1982.

== History of creation ==
The idea of creating a People's University came about by interviewing applicants at MSU Faculty of Mechanics and Mathematics (Mekhmat) who did not pass the selection committee, primarily due to their Jewish origin, from mathematicians Bella Subbotovskaya and Valery Senderov. The first stream was recruited in 1978 directly at Moscow State University and amounted to 14 people. Classes were held at Bella Abramovna's apartment.

The sets of 1979 – 1981 and exceeded 100 people, not all of whom, however, remained after the first year: for example, out of more than 120 people recruited in 1980, about 60 remained. This is due to both the very high level of difficulty of the material taught and the fact that students were forced to study at other institutes at the same time and not everyone could withstand this pace. Classes were held in various classrooms throughout Moscow, at the school where Subbotovskaya worked, some classes for senior courses were held in Bella Abramovna's apartment. To order classrooms, the name "Refresher Courses for Teachers of Evening Mathematical Schools" was used.

== Teachers ==
=== 1978 ===
Lecturers:

- A.M. Vinogradov – Calculus
- I. S. Krasil'shchik – Algebra
- V.V. Lychagin – Geometry
- V. A. Senderov – Calculus
- A. B. Sosinsky – Algebra

The seminars were conducted by:

- A.V. Bocharov – Algebra
- S.V. Duzhin – Geometry
- A.V. Samokhin – Calculus

=== 1979 ===
Lecturers:

- I.N. Bernstein
- E. S. Bozhich
- V. A. Ginzburg – Algebra
- A. Shen – Calculus
- V. B. Shekhtman

Some lectures on this stream were read by I. N. Bernshtein, V. G. Kanovei and S. G. Smirnov.

=== 1980 ===
Lecturers:

- A.V. Zelevinsky – Calculus
- E. M. Kuznitsky – Galois theory
- A. B. Sosinsky – Algebra
- B. L. Feigin – Algebra
- D. B. Fuchs – Geometry, Linear Algebra

Some lectures on this stream were read by I.N. Bernstein, D. Leites and visitor John Milnor.

The seminars were conducted by :

- B.I. Kanevsky

=== 1981 ===
Lecturers:

- A. G. Kulakov – Algebra
- A. L. Onishchik – Linear Algebra
- A. Shen – Calculus

At Bella Abramovna’s apartment, Yu. N. Tyurin taught an optional course in Probability Theory, and M. S. Marinov in Physics.

=== 1980–1983 ===
All these years there was a working seminar led by D. B. Fuchs, A. V. Zelevinsky and B. L. Feigin.

== Closing and further fate ==
In 1982, V. A. Senderov and a lecturer B. I. Kanevsky were arrested, and B. A. Subbotovskaya died tragically, when she was hit by a truck under strange circumstances that did not exclude the possibility of murder. By the fall of 1982, lectures had almost ceased; some of the students were taught until spring 1983.
