= TC1 =

TC1 may refer to:

- TC1 studio, a BBC studio at Television Centre, London
- Tc1 transposon, a transposon active in Caenorhabditis elegans, and the, all inactive, Tc1-like transposons in humans, of the Tc1/mariner class of transposons
- Minolta TC-1, a camera
- Sky Sword I, a Taiwanese anti-aircraft missile also known as Tien Chien 1 or TC-1
- TC1 Touring Car, a touring car racing specification
- TC (complexity)
