= LH (complexity) =

In computational complexity, the logarithmic time hierarchy (LH) is the complexity class of all computational problems solvable in a logarithmic amount of computation time on an alternating Turing machine with a bounded number of alternations. It is a particular case of a bounded alternating Turing machine hierarchy. It is equal to FO and to FO-uniform AC^{0}.

The $i$th level of the logarithmic time hierarchy is the set of languages recognised by alternating Turing machines in logarithmic time with random access and $i-1$ alternations, beginning with an existential state. LH is the union of all levels.
