= AC (complexity) =

In circuit complexity, AC is a complexity class hierarchy. Each class, AC^{i}, consists of the languages recognized by Boolean circuits with depth $O(\log^i n)$ and a polynomial number of unlimited fan-in AND and OR gates.

The name "AC" was chosen by analogy to NC, with the "A" in the name standing for "alternating" and referring both to the alternation between the AND and OR gates in the circuits and to alternating Turing machines.

The smallest AC class is AC^{0}, consisting of constant-depth unlimited fan-in circuits.

The total hierarchy of AC classes is defined as

$\mbox{AC} = \bigcup_{i \geq 0} \mbox{AC}^i$

== Relation to NC ==
The AC classes are related to NC, ACC, and TC classes. For each i, we have

$$\mathsf{NC}^i \subseteq \mathsf{AC}^i \subseteq \mathsf{ACC}^{i}  \subseteq \mathsf{TC}^{i} \subseteq \mathsf{NC}^{i+1}.$$

As an immediate consequence of this, we have that NC = AC = ACC = TC.

We have $\mathsf{NC}^0 \subsetneq \mathsf{AC}^0 \subsetneq \mathsf{ACC}^{0}$. Specifically, PARITY is in $\mathsf{ACC}^0$ but not in $\mathsf{AC}^0$. And since NC requires bounded fan-in, any function of type $\{0, 1\}^n \to \{0, 1\}$ whose output depends on more than $O(1)$ inputs is beyond $\mathsf{NC}^0$. In particular, the unbounded fan-in OR is beyond $\mathsf{NC}^0$.

In detail, define $f_n: \{0, 1\}^n \to \{0, 1\}$ by $f_n(x_1, \dots, x_n) = \sum_i x_i \mod 2$. Then it requires $\Omega(2^{\frac{n^{1 / d}}{16}})$ gates to be computed by a $\mathsf{AC}^0$ circuit with depth $\leq d$.

== Variations ==
The power of the AC classes can be affected by adding additional gates. If we add gates which calculate the modulo operation for some modulus m, we have the classes ACC^{i}[m].
