= Integer circuit =

In computational complexity theory, an integer circuit is a circuit model of computation in which inputs to the circuit are sets of integers and each gate of the circuit computes either a set operation or an arithmetic operation on its input sets.

As an algorithmic problem, the possible questions are to find if a given integer is an element of the output node or if two circuits compute the same set. The decidability is still an open question, but there are results on restriction of those circuits. Finding answers to some questions about this model could serve as a proof to many important mathematical conjectures, like Goldbach's conjecture.

It is a natural extension of the circuits over sets of natural numbers when the considered set contains also negative integers, the definitions, which does not change, will not be repeated on this page. Only the differences will be mentioned.

== Complexity of the membership problem ==
The membership problem is the problem of deciding, given an integer circuit C, an input to the circuit X, and a specific integer n, whether the integer n is in the output of the circuit C when provided with input X. The computational complexity of this problem depends on the type of gates allowed in the circuit C. The table below summarizes the computational complexity of the membership problem for various classes of integer circuits. Here, MF$_{\mathbb Z}$(O) denotes the classes defined by O-formulae, which are O-circuits with maximal fan-out 1.

Complexity
O	MC$_{\mathbb Z}$(O)	MF$_{\mathbb Z}$(O)
∪,∩,−,+,×	NEXPTIME-hard	PSPACE-hard
∪,∩,+,×	NEXPTIME-complete	NP-complete
∪,+,×	NEXPTIME-complete	NP-complete
∩,+,×	P-hard, in co-NP	L-hard, in LOGCFL
+,×	P-hard, in co-NP	L-hard, in LOGCFL
∪,∩,−,+	PSPACE-complete	PSPACE-complete
∪,∩,+	PSPACE-complete	NP-complete
∪,+	NP-complete	NP-complete
∩,+	C_{=}L-complete	L-complete
+	C_{=}L-complete	L-complete
∪,∩,−,×	PSPACE-complete	PSPACE-complete
∪,∩,×	PSPACE-complete	NP-complete
∪,×	NP-complete	NP-complete
∩,×	(C_{=}L$\land\oplus$L)-hard, in P	L-complete
×	(NL-complete$\land\oplus$L)-complete	L-complete
∪,∩,−	P-complete	L-complete
∪,∩	P-complete	L-complete
∪	NL-complete	L-complete
∩	NL-complete	L-complete
