= Pneumatic circuit =

Mechanical control via compressed gas

A pneumatic circuit is an interconnected set of components that convert compressed gas (usually air) into mechanical work. In the normal sense of the term, the circuit must include a compressor or compressor-fed tank.

== Components ==
The circuit comprises the following components:

- Active components
  - Compressor
- Transmission lines
  - Air tank
  - Pneumatic hoses
  - Open atmosphere (for returning the spent gas to the compressor)
  - Valves
- Passive components
  - Pneumatic cylinders
  - Service Unit
- FRL - Filter Regulator and Lubricator

=== Pneumatic cylinder ===
In general, based on the application, a pneumatic cylinder is usually a single-acting cylinder, where there is a single port in the cylinder. In single-acting cylinders, the port extends using compressed air and retracts using an open coiled spring. In double-acting cylinders, two ports both extend and retract using compressed air.

Single Acting Cylinder

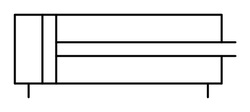
Double Acting Cylinder

=== Direction control valve (DCV) ===
The direction control valve is used to control the direction of flow of compressed air. They are usually classified into normally open (NO) and normally closed (NC) valves. The normally open valves will permit flow from the inlet port of the valve to the outlet port, normally the flow will be cut by changing the position of the valve. The normally closed valves will not permit flow from the inlet port of the valve to the outlet port, normally the flow will be permitted only by changing the position of the valve. In general, valves are designated as 2/2 DCV, 3/2 DCV, 5/2 DCV, 5/3 DCV etc., in which the first number indicates number of ports and second number indicates number of positions. To change the position, the valves are generally actuated by:

- Pedal operated
- Push button operated
- Spring operated
- Solenoid operated
- By using the pneumatic source itself etc.

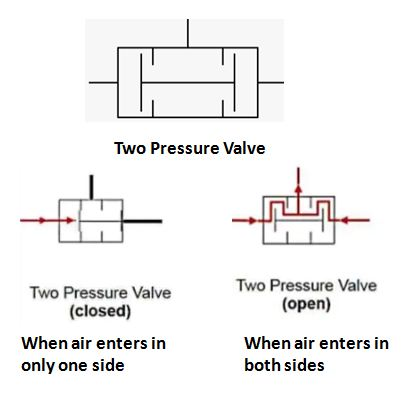

=== Two pressure valve (AND Valve) ===
A two pressure valve generally uses two valve actuators (push buttons). When both buttons are pressed at the same time, air flows through the valve, but if either button is released, the air flow stops. They are generally used in mechanical presses and machine tools to ensure that both of the operator's hands are outside the machine or press during operation.

=== OR Valve ===
An OR valve generally uses two valve actuators (push buttons). When either button is pressed, the air flow takes place. This is also called a shuttle valve.

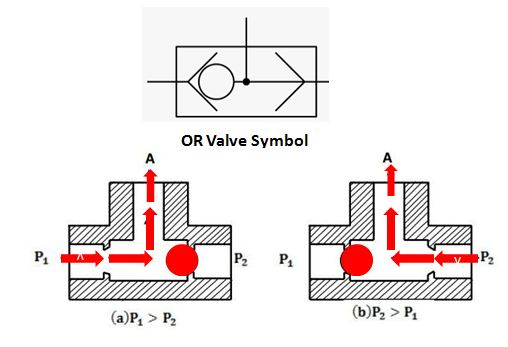

=== Check valve ===
A check valve (or non-return valve) allows air flow in one direction only.

=== Quick exhaust valve ===
A quick exhaust valve is an OR valve with an exhaust port, ensuring quick return of the cylinder and reducing cycle time.

=== Flow control valve ===
The combination throttle valve connected to the check valve is called a one way flow control valve. While air passes from one direction to the other, the check valve will not allow air flow as the check valve allows flow only in one direction. While passing through the restricted way of throttle, compressed air flow takes place. While the air comes out from the other way, both directions of throttle and the check valve open to pass the compressed air, allowing the piston movement in one direction to be controlled.

=== Time delay valve ===
The combination of a 3/2 direction control valve, reservoir and flow control valve is a time delay valve. This valve is used to delay the actuation of a cylinder after pressing the push button or pedal.

=== Pressure relief valve ===
The pressure relief valve keeps the system from exceeding a set pressure. If the pressure increases beyond the set pressure, the pressure relief valve opens, releasing some compressed air into the atmosphere.

== See also ==
- Compressed air – Air under a pressure greater than atmospheric
- Pneumatics – Use of pressurised gas in mechanical systems
- Circuit (disambiguation)
- Fluidics – Use of a fluid to perform analog or digital operations
