= Johan Håstad =

Swedish computer scientist

- Born: 19 November 1960 (age 65)
- Education: Massachusetts Institute of Technology; Uppsala University; Stockholm University
- Awards: IMO gold medal (1977); ACM Doctoral Dissertation Award (1985); Gödel Prize (1994, 2011); Knuth Prize (2018)
- Scientific career
- Fields: Computer science
- Workplaces: KTH Royal Institute of Technology
- Doctoral advisor: Shafrira Goldwasser

Johan Torkel Håstad (Swedish pronunciation: [ˈjûːan ˈhǒːsta]; born 19 November 1960) is a Swedish theoretical computer scientist most known for his work on computational complexity theory. He was the recipient of the Gödel Prize in 1994 and 2011 and the ACM Doctoral Dissertation Award in 1986, among other prizes. He has been a professor in theoretical computer science at KTH Royal Institute of Technology in Stockholm, Sweden since 1988, becoming a full professor in 1992. He is a member of the Royal Swedish Academy of Sciences since 2001.

He received his B.S. in Mathematics at Stockholm University in 1981, his M.S. in Mathematics at Uppsala University in 1984 and his Ph.D. in Mathematics from MIT in 1986.

Håstad's thesis and 1994 Gödel Prize concerned his work on lower bounds on the size of constant-depth Boolean circuits for the parity function. After Andrew Yao proved that such circuits require exponential size, Håstad proved nearly optimal lower bounds on the necessary size through his switching lemma, which became an important technical tool in circuit complexity with applications to learnability, the IP hierarchy, and proof systems.

He also received the 2011 Gödel Prize for his work on optimal inapproximability results. In particular, he improved the PCP theorem (which won the same prize in 2001) to give a probabilistic verifier for NP problems which reads only three bits. Further, he used these results to prove results in hardness of approximation.

In 1998 Håstad was an Invited Speaker of the International Congress of Mathematicians in Berlin. In 1999 he was an Erdős Lecturer at the Hebrew University of Jerusalem. In 2012, he became a fellow of the American Mathematical Society. He was elected as an ACM Fellow in 2018 for "contributions in circuit complexity, approximability and inapproximability, and foundations of pseudorandomness".

In 2018 he received the Knuth Prize "for his long and sustained record of milestone breakthroughs at the foundations of computer science, with huge impact on many areas including optimization, cryptography, parallel computing, and complexity theory."
