= Ashok K. Chandra =

- Born: 30 July 1948
- Died: 15 November 2014 (aged 66); California, United States
- Education: Berkeley
- Known for: Conjunctive queries, alternating Turing machines
- Scientific career
- Fields: Computer science
- Workplaces: IBM Research; Microsoft Research
- Doctoral advisor: Zohar Manna

Ashok K. Chandra (30 July 1948 – 15 November 2014) was a computer scientist at Microsoft Research in Mountain View, California, United States, where he was a general manager at the Internet Services Research Center. Chandra received his PhD in Computer Science from Stanford University, an MS from University of California, Berkeley, and a BTech from IIT Kanpur. He was previously Director of Database and Distributed Systems at IBM Almaden Research Center.

Chandra co-authored several key papers in theoretical computer science. Among other contributions, he introduced alternating Turing machines in computational complexity (with Dexter Kozen and Larry Stockmeyer), conjunctive queries in databases (with Philip M. Merlin), computable queries (with David Harel), and multiparty communication complexity (with Merrick L. Furst and Richard J. Lipton).

He was a founder of the annual IEEE Symposium on Logic in Computer Science and served as conference chair of the first three conferences, in 1986–8. He was an IEEE Fellow.
