= The Circuit =

The Circuit may refer to:

- The Circuit (TV series), an Australian drama television series
- The Circuit (radio show), an internet radio show produced by Card Player magazine
- The Circuit (2008 film), a 2008 made-for-TV movie starring Bill Campbell and Michelle Trachtenberg
- The Circuit (newspaper), a defunct African-American newspaper
- The Circuit: Stories from the Life of a Migrant Child, a 1997 children's novel by Francisco Jiménez often called The Circuit
- The Circuit, a 1986 Japanese racing game known globally as World Grand Prix

== See also ==
- Circuit (disambiguation)
