= AC0 =

Complexity class of bounded-depth circuits

Diagram of an AC^{0} circuit: The n input bits are on the bottom and the top gate produces the output; the circuit consists of AND- and OR-gates of polynomial fan-in each, and the alternation depth is bounded by a constant.

AC^{0} (alternating circuit) is a complexity class used in circuit complexity. It is the smallest class in the AC hierarchy, and consists of all families of circuits of depth O(1) and polynomial size, with unlimited-fanin AND gates and OR gates (we allow NOT gates only at the inputs). It thus contains NC^{0}, which has only bounded-fanin AND and OR gates. Such circuits are called "alternating circuits", since it is only necessary for the layers to alternate between all-AND and all-OR, since one AND after another AND is equivalent to a single AND, and the same for OR.

== Example problems ==
Integer addition and subtraction are computable in AC^{0}, but multiplication is not (specifically, when the inputs are two integers under the usual binary or base-10 representations of integers).

Since it is a circuit class, like P/poly, AC^{0} also contains every unary language.

== Descriptive complexity ==
From a descriptive complexity viewpoint, DLOGTIME-uniform AC^{0} is equal to the descriptive class FO+BIT of all languages describable in first-order logic with the addition of the BIT predicate, or alternatively by FO(+, ×), or by Turing machine in the logarithmic hierarchy.

== Separations ==
In 1984 Furst, Saxe, and Sipser showed that calculating the PARITY of the input bits (unlike the aforementioned addition/subtraction problems above which had two inputs) cannot be decided by any AC^{0} circuits, even with non-uniformity. Similarly, computing the majority is also not in $\mathsf{AC}^0$. It follows that AC^{0} is strictly smaller than TC^{0}. Note that "PARITY" is also called "XOR" in the literature.

However, PARITY is only barely out of AC^{0}, in the sense that for any $k > 0$, there exists a family of alternating circuits using depth $\lceil k \ln n / \ln\ln n \rceil$ and size $O\left(2^{(\ln n)^{1/k}} \frac{n}{(\ln n)^{1/k}} \right)$. In particular, setting $k$ to be a large constant, then there exists a family of alternating circuits using depth $O(\ln n / \ln\ln n)\ll O(\ln n)$, and size only slightly superlinear.

$\mathsf{AC}^0$ can be divided further, into a hierarchy of languages requiring up to 1 layer, 2 layers, etc. Let $\mathsf{AC}^0_d$ be the class of languages decidable by a threshold circuit family of up to depth $d$:
$$\mathsf{AC}^0_1 \subset \mathsf{AC}^0_2  \subset \cdots  \subset \mathsf{AC}^0 = \bigcup_{d=1}^\infty \mathsf{AC}^0_d$$
The following problem is $\mathsf{AC}^0_d$-complete under a uniformity condition: given a grid graph of polynomial length and width $d$, decide whether two given vertices are connected.

The addition of two $n$-bit integers is in $\mathsf{AC}^0_3$ but not in $\mathsf{AC}^0_2$.
