= Random-access Turing machine =

In computational complexity, a field of theoretical computer science, random-access Turing machines extend the functionality of conventional Turing machines by introducing the capability for random access to memory positions. The inherent ability of RATMs to access any memory cell in a constant amount of time significantly decreases the computation time required for problems where data size and access speed are critical factors. As conventional Turing machines can only access data sequentially, the capabilities of RATMs are more closely related to the memory access patterns of modern computing systems and provide a more realistic framework for analyzing algorithms that handle the complexities of large-scale data.

== Definition ==
The random-access Turing machine is characterized chiefly by its capacity for direct memory access: on a random-access Turing machine, there is a special pointer tape of logarithmic space accepting a binary vocabulary. The Turing machine has a special state such that when the binary number on the pointer tape is 'p', the Turing machine will write on the working tape the pth symbol of the input. This attribute, which deviates from the sequential memory access inherent to standard Turing machines, allows RATMs to access any memory cell in a consistent and time-efficient manner. Notably, this characteristic of RATMs echoes the operation of contemporary computing systems featuring random-access memory (RAM). The formal model of RATMs enables the execution time of an instruction to be contingent upon the size of the numbers involved, bridging the gap between abstract computation models and real-world computational requirements.

Additionally, the complexity and computational capacity of RATMs provide a framework for understanding the mechanics of computational theory. This model has been expanded to include both discrete and real-valued arithmetic operations, along with a finite precision test for real number comparisons. These extensions, including the universal random-access Turing machine (URATM), reflect the ongoing exploration of universal computation within the landscape of theoretical computer science.

== Operational efficiency ==
The pointer tape facility lets the Turing machine read any letter of the input without taking time to move over the entire input, which is mandatory for complexity classes using less than linear time.

The comparison of RATMs with other computational models reveals that functions computable on a RAM in time $O(t)$ can be translated to a Turing machine computation time of $O(t^2 \cdot \log(t) \cdot \log\log(t))$, and vice versa. This translation is indicative of the RATMs' robustness and versatility in handling a variety of computational tasks, particularly in large data scenarios. The random access capability of RATMs enhances data retrieval and manipulation processes, making them highly efficient for tasks where large datasets are involved. This efficiency is not just theoretical but has practical implications in the way algorithms are designed and executed in real-world computing environments.

== Variants and extensions ==
The theoretical landscape of RATMs has been significantly broadened by the advent of various variants and extensions. One extension is the universal random-access Turing machine (URATM), which has been instrumental in validating the existence and efficiency of universal computation within the random-access framework. This variant not only bolsters the computational capacity of RATMs but also serves as a tool in other theoretical investigations into computational complexity and universality. Another extension is the formulation of quantum random-access Turing machines (QRATMs). These machines integrate the principles of quantum computing with the RATM framework, leading to a model that is more aligned with the architecture of modern quantum computers. QRATMs leverage properties of quantum mechanics, such as superposition and entanglement, to achieve computational capabilities that surpass those of classical RATMs. This quantum extension opens up new avenues in complexity analysis, offering more understanding of computational problems in a quantum context. Specifically, QRATMs have shed light on the relationships between quantum computational models and their classical counterparts, providing insights into the bounds and capabilities of quantum computational efficiency.

== Applications ==
RATMs have found application in the realm of big data computing, where their unique operational features facilitate exploration of both tractability and complexity. The ability of RATMs to execute operations in a time-bounded manner and provide random memory access makes them suitable for handling the challenges inherent in big data scenarios. Traditional views on computational tractability, typically defined within the realm of polynomial time, are often inadequate for addressing the massive scale of big data. RATMs, by contrast, enable a more nuanced approach, adopting sublinear time as a new standard for identifying tractable problems in big data computing.

Moreover, the application of RATMs extends beyond just theoretical exploration; they provide a practical framework for developing algorithms and computational strategies tailored to the unique demands of big data problems. As big data continues to grow in both size and importance, the insights gained from studying RATMs have opened new avenues for research and practical applications in this field.

== Computational complexity and time–space tradeoffs ==
The exploration of RATMs extends into the domain of computational complexity and time–space tradeoffs, particularly in the context of nondeterministic computations.

A key focus in this realm is the analysis of the inherent tradeoffs between time and space when solving computationally intensive problems. For instance, it is observed that certain computational problems, such as satisfiability, cannot be solved on general-purpose random-access Turing machines within specific time and space constraints. This indicates that there is a distinct tradeoff between the time taken to compute a function and the memory space required to perform the computation effectively. Specifically, results have shown that satisfiability cannot be resolved on these machines in time $n^{1.618}$ and $n^{o(1)}$.

Additionally, the research explores how time–space tradeoffs affect nondeterministic linear time computations with RATMs, showing that certain problems solvable in nondeterministic linear time under specific space limits are infeasible in deterministic time and space constraints. This finding emphasizes the distinct computational behaviors of deterministic and nondeterministic models in RATMs, highlighting the need to consider time and space efficiency in algorithm design and computational theory.

== Technical and Logical Foundations ==
The study of RATMs has been advanced through the exploration of deterministic polylogarithmic time and space and two-sorted logic, a concept explored in depth by recent research. This approach focuses on analyzing the efficiency and logical structure of RATMs, specifically how they can be optimized to perform computations in polynomial time with respect to the size of input data.

=== Deterministic polylogarithmic time and space ===
Deterministic polylogarithmic time and space in RATMs refer to a computational efficiency where the time and space required for computation grow at a polylogarithmic rate with the size of the input data. This concept is pivotal in understanding how RATMs can be optimized for handling large data sets efficiently. It hypothesizes that certain computations, which previously seemed infeasible in polynomial time, can be executed effectively within this framework.

=== Two-sorted logic ===
The use of two-sorted logic in the context of RATMs provides an approach to describing and analyzing computational processes. This framework involves distinguishing between two types of entities: numerical values and positions in data structures. By separating these entities, this approach allows for a more refined analysis of computational steps and the relationships between different parts of a data structure, such as arrays or lists. This methodology provides insights into the logical structure of algorithms, enabling a more precise understanding of their behavior. The application of two-sorted logic in RATMs significantly contributes to the field of descriptive complexity.
