= Steven Rudich =

American computer scientist (1961–2024)

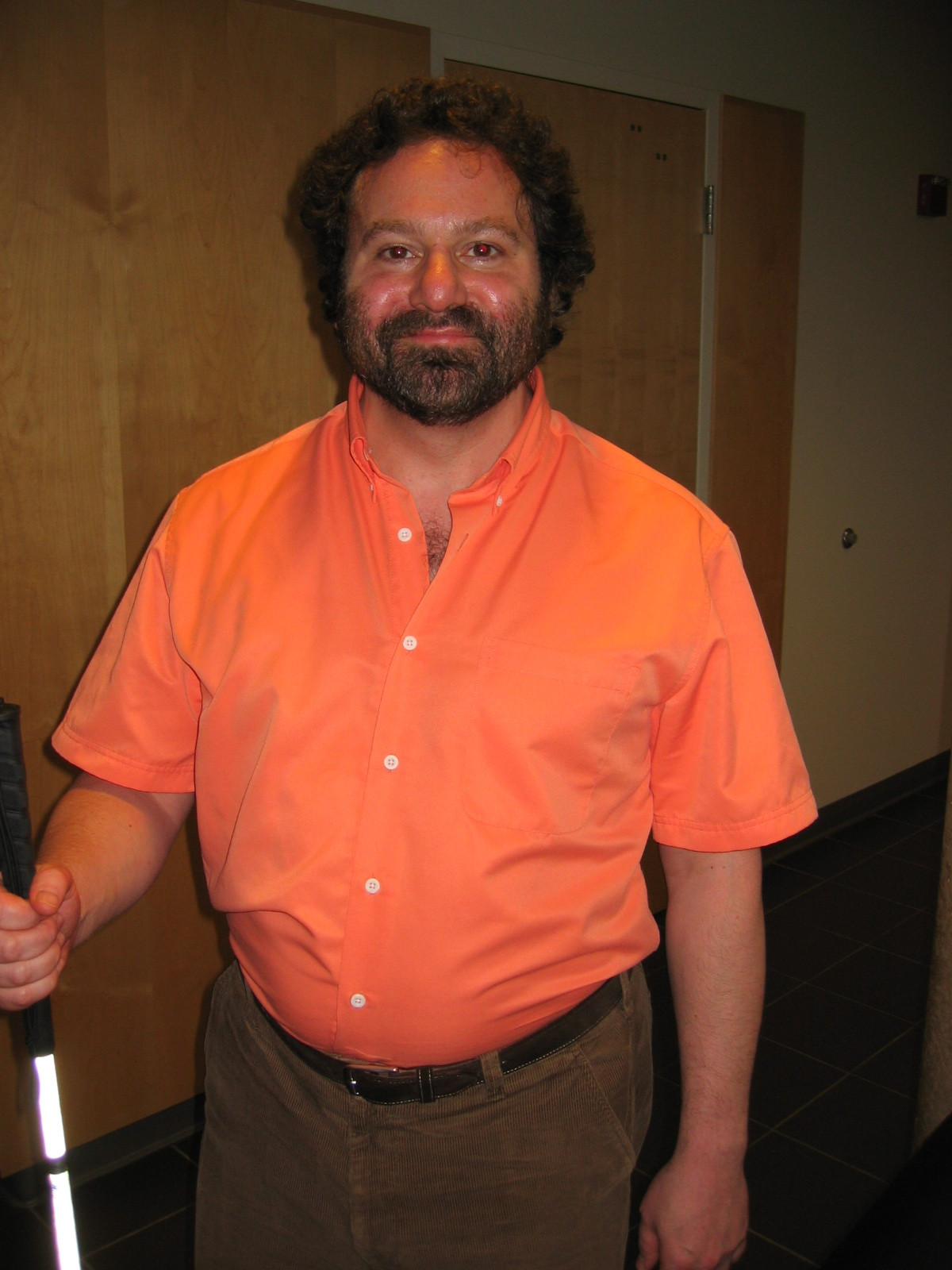
- Rudich in 2004
- Born: October 4, 1961
- Died: October 29, 2024 (aged 63)
- Awards: Gödel Prize

Academic work
- Discipline: Computer Science
- Sub-discipline: Computational complexity theory
- Institutions: Carnegie Mellon
- Notable ideas: Natural proof
- Website: https://www.cs.cmu.edu/~rudich/

Steven Rudich (/ˈrʌdɪk/; October 4, 1961 – October 29, 2024) was an American computational theorist. He was a professor in the Carnegie Mellon School of Computer Science. In 1994, he and Alexander Razborov proved that a large class of combinatorial arguments, dubbed natural proofs, was unlikely to answer many of the important problems in computational complexity theory. For this work, they were awarded the Gödel Prize in 2007. He also co-authored a paper demonstrating that all currently known NP-complete problems remain NP-complete even under AC^{0} or NC^{0} reductions.

Amongst Carnegie Mellon students, he is best known as the teacher of the class "Great Theoretical Ideas in Computer Science" (formerly named "How to Think Like a Computer Scientist"), often considered one of the most difficult classes in the undergraduate computer science curriculum. He was a long-time editor of the Journal of Cryptology, as well as an accomplished magician. His Erdős number is 2.

== Leap@CMU ==
Rudich (and Merrick Furst, now a Distinguished Professor at the Georgia Institute of Technology) began the Leap@CMU (formerly called Andrew's Leap) summer enrichment program for high school (and occasionally, middle school) students in 1991. The summer enrichment program focuses mainly on theoretical aspects of Computer Science in the morning, followed by lunch recess, and then an elective—Robotics, Programming, or Mathematics Theory. The Programming elective is broken down into Intro Programming, Intermediate Programming, and Advanced Programming. As of 2017, the Math Theory Elective has been removed. Most days, there is also an afternoon lecture by a Carnegie Mellon University faculty member. This is placed between lunch and electives.

To enroll in Andrew's Leap, one must take a specialized test known as The Interesting Test. This assessment is supposed to gauge ability to think outside the box, and aptitude for computer-related math. Performance in school is not taken into account when deciding who is ready to take the course.

As of summer 2018, this program has been discontinued.
