= Valery Senderov =

- Born: 17 March 1945; Moscow, Soviet Union
- Died: 12 November 2014 (aged 69); Moscow, Russia
- Education: Moscow Institute of Physics and Technology
- Scientific career
- Fields: Mathematics, Politics

Valery Senderov (Russian: Валерий Сендеров; 17 March 1945 – 12 November 2014) was a Soviet dissident, mathematician, teacher, and advocate of human rights known for his struggle against state-sponsored antisemitism.

== Biography ==
Senderov was born on 17 March 1945 in Moscow. In 1962, he was accepted at the prestigious Moscow Institute of Physics and Technology, where he studied mathematics. In 1968, just before completing his doctoral dissertation, Senderov was expelled for the dissemination of "philosophical literature", which was a euphemism for anything that was viewed by the censors as being anti-Soviet. He was given the opportunity to complete his degree in 1970.

In the 1970s, Senderov taught mathematics at the Second Mathematical School in Moscow. Toward the end of the decade, he joined the National Alliance of Russian Solidarists, an anticommunist organization headed by Russian emigres, and also the International Society for Human Rights. In the 1980s, Senderov became one of the leaders of the International Society for Human Rights and one of the founders of the Free Interprofessional Association of Workers, the first labor union in the Soviet Union that sought to be free of government control.

In 1982, Senderov was arrested by the KGB for publishing anticommunist articles in Russian-language newspapers printed abroad, in particular the magazine Posev (Sowing) and the newspaper Russkaya Mysl. After his arrest, Senderov openly admitted to the KGB that he was a member of the National Alliance of Russian Solidarists, becoming one of just two openly avowed members of this anticommunist group in the Soviet Union. At his trial, Senderov stated that he was a member of anticommunist groups and expressed that he would continue to fight against the Soviet regime even after he was freed from incarceration. He was sentenced to 7 years of hard labor and a subsequent probationary exile of an additional 5 years.

He was sent to a prison camp for political prisoners near Perm, where he spent much of his time in solitary confinement in a cold cell on rationed food for his refusal to comply with the rules of the prison camp. He refused to comply to protest the confiscation of his Bible and the prohibition against studying mathematics. In 1987, Senderov was released and, in 1988, became the leader of the National Alliance of Russian Solidarists in the Soviet Union, holding the first official press conference in this new role in 1988. During the period of perestroika, the National Alliance took an active part in supporting opposition parties. Over the course of his life, Senderov authored dozens of political articles in magazines, newspapers, and anthologies, as well as a number of mathematical works dealing with functional analysis. He also wrote three books.

== Struggle against Antisemitism ==
In 1980, Senderov self-published with Boris Kanevsky a work titled "Intellectual Genocide" about the discrimination by Soviet universities against Jewish applicants. In particular, the work singled out the mechanical and mathematical departments at the prestigious Moscow State University.

Senderov shed light on the various methods used by the university administration to dissuade and reject Jewish applicants. One method was to hand-pick the most difficult problems from the International Mathematical Olympiad and to give these problems to Jewish applicants as part of the entrance examinations - a practice that was specifically prohibited by the Soviet Ministry of Education. Another method was to select problems that could be solved given the standard high school curriculum, but whose solution required far more time than allotted for the entrance exams. In addition, admission committees would ask Jewish applicants questions that were far outside the standard high school curriculum or separate them into special groups and then find reasons to fail those groups during the more subjective oral exams.

In addition to describing the various methods used to reject Jewish applicants, Senderov also provided practical advice on preparing for the types of questions often asked of such applicants and using the appeals process to fight against unfair admission decisions.

In conjunction with publishing this work, Senderov became one of the founders of a set of informal courses of study under the moniker of "Jewish National University", where well-known mathematicians gave lectures to applicants who had been denied admission to Moscow State University for being Jewish.

== Death ==
On 12 November 2014, he died at the age of 69 in Moscow.
