= Larry Stockmeyer =

American computer scientist

- Born: 1948
- Died: 31 July 2004 (aged 55–56)
- Occupation: computer scientist
- Known for: Pioneers in the field of computational complexity theory

Larry Joseph Stockmeyer (1948 – 31 July 2004) was an American computer scientist. He was one of the pioneers in the field of computational complexity theory, and he also worked in the field of distributed computing. He died of pancreatic cancer.

== Career ==
- 1972: BSc in mathematics, Massachusetts Institute of Technology.
- 1972: MSc in electrical engineering, Massachusetts Institute of Technology.
- 1974: PhD in computer science, Massachusetts Institute of Technology.
  - Supervisor: Albert R. Meyer.
- 1974–1982: IBM Research, Thomas J. Watson Research Center, Yorktown Heights, NY.
- 1982–November 2003: IBM Research, Almaden Research Center, San Jose, CA.
- October 2002 – 2004: University of California, Santa Cruz, Computer Science Department – Research Associate.

== Recognition ==
- 1996: Fellow of the Association for Computing Machinery: "For several fundamental contributions to computational complexity theory, which have significantly affected the course of this field."
- 2007: The Edsger W. Dijkstra Prize in Distributed Computing for the paper Dwork, Lynch & Stockmeyer (1988).

== Notable publications ==
- Meyer & Stockmeyer (1972) — this work introduced the polynomial hierarchy.
- Stockmeyer (1974) — "one of the most remarkable doctoral theses in computer science".
- Chandra & Stockmeyer (1976) — this work introduced alternating Turing machines.
- Dwork, Lynch & Stockmeyer (1988) — this paper received the Dijkstra Prize in 2007.
