= Polylogarithmic function =

Polynomial function with logarithm terms

In mathematics, a polylogarithmic function in n is a polynomial in the logarithm of n,

$$a_k (\log n)^k + a_{k-1} (\log n)^{k-1} + \cdots + a_1(\log n) + a_0.$$

The notation log^{k}n is often used as a shorthand for (log n)^{k}, analogous to sin^{2}θ for (sin θ)^{2}.

In computer science, polylogarithmic functions occur as the order of time for some data structure operations. Additionally, the exponential function of a polylogarithmic function produces a function with quasi-polynomial growth, and algorithms with this as their time complexity are said to take quasi-polynomial time.

All polylogarithmic functions of n are o(n^{ε}) for every exponent ε > 0 (for the meaning of this symbol, see small o notation), that is, a polylogarithmic function grows more slowly than any positive exponent. This observation is the basis for the soft O notation Õ(n).
