= Fan-in =

Number of inputs a logical gate can handle

An AND gate with three inputs has a fan-in of 3.

Fan-in is the number of inputs a logic gate can handle. For instance the fan-in for the AND gate shown in the figure is 3. Physical logic gates with a large fan-in tend to be slower than those with a small fan-in. This is because the complexity of the input circuitry increases the input capacitance of the device. Using logic gates with higher fan-in will help in reducing the depth of a logic circuit; this is because circuit design is realized by the target logic family at a digital level, meaning any large fan-in logic gates are simply the smaller fan-in gates chained together in series at a given depth to widen the circuit instead.

Fan-in tree of a node refers to a collection of signals that contribute to the input signal of that node.

In quantum logic gates the fan-in always has to be equal to the number of outputs, the fan-out. Gates for which the numbers of inputs and outputs differ would not be reversible (unitary) and are therefore not allowed.

== See also ==
- Fan-out, a related concept, which is the number of inputs that a given logic output drives.
