= Arimaa =

Two-player abstract strategy board game

- An Arimaa board before setup
- Designers: Omar Syed and Aamir Syed
- Publishers: Z-Man Games
- Years active: 2002 – present
- Genres: Board game Abstract strategy game
- Players: 2
- Setup time: < 1 minute
- Playing time: 15 minutes – 2 hours
- Chance: None
- Skills: Strategy, tactics
- Website: http://www.arimaa.com

Arimaa (/əˈriːmə/ ə-REE-mə) is a two-player strategy board game that was designed to be playable with a standard chess set and difficult for computers while still being easy to learn and fun to play for humans. It was invented between 1997 and 2002 by Omar Syed. Arimaa is a complex abstract strategy game and after decades of play, a body of theory has developed among high level players, along with a few books on the game. Arimaa has also developed a community on the internet, where tournaments are played.

An Indian-American computer engineer trained in artificial intelligence, Omar Syed was inspired to design a new game by Garry Kasparov's defeat by the chess computer Deep Blue. His goal was to make a game that could be played with a standard chess set, would be difficult for computers to play well, but would have rules simple enough for his then four-year-old son Aamir to understand. The name "Arimaa" is "Aamir" spelled backwards plus an initial "a". In 2002, Omar Syed published the rules of Arimaa and had them patented in 2003 (the patent expired in 2023), and the name Arimaa became a registered trademark. Arimaa sets were developed and sold by Z-man Games beginning in 2009.

Syed also established the Arimaa Challenge to promote the game. A prize of USD 10,000 would be available each year until 2020 to reward the first program, running on a standard consumer computer, capable of defeating a high-level human player in a match of six games or more. Beginning in 2004, the Arimaa community held three annual tournaments: a World Championship (humans only), a Computer Championship (computers only), and the Arimaa Challenge (human vs. computer). After eleven years of human dominance, the 2015 challenge was won decisively by the computer (Sharp by David Wu).

Arimaa has won several awards including GAMES Magazine 2011 Best Abstract Strategy Game, Creative Child Magazine 2010 Strategy Game of the Year, and the 2010 Parents' Choice Approved Award. It has also been the subject of several research papers.

== Rules ==
Arimaa is played on an 8×8 board with four trap squares. There are six kinds of pieces, ranging from elephant (strongest) to rabbit (weakest). Stronger pieces can push or pull weaker pieces, and stronger pieces freeze weaker pieces. Pieces can be captured by dislodging them onto a trap square when they have no orthogonally adjacent friendly pieces.

The two players, Gold and Silver, each control sixteen pieces. These are, in order from strongest to weakest: one elephant, one camel, two horses, two dogs, two cats, and eight rabbits. These may be represented by the king, queen, rooks, bishops, knights, and pawns respectively when one plays using a chess set.

a8	b8	c8	d8	e8	f8	g8	h8
a7	b7	c7	d7	e7	f7	g7	h7
a6	b6	c6 (trap)	d6	e6	f6 (trap)	g6	h6
a5	b5	c5	d5	e5	f5	g5	h5
a4	b4	c4	d4	e4	f4	g4	h4
a3	b3	c3 (trap)	d3	e3	f3 (trap)	g3	h3
a2	b2	c2	d2	e2	f2	g2	h2
a1	b1	c1	d1	e1	f1	g1	h1

Diagram 1
The players begin by setting up their pieces however they choose on their home rows.

=== Objective ===
The main object of the game is to move a rabbit of one's own colour onto the home rank of the opponent, which is known as a goal. Thus Gold wins by moving a gold rabbit to the eighth rank, and Silver wins by moving a silver rabbit to the first rank. However, because it is difficult to usher a rabbit to the goal line while the board is full of pieces, an intermediate objective is to capture opposing pieces by pushing them into the trap squares.

The game can also be won by capturing all of the opponent's rabbits (elimination) or by depriving the opponent of legal moves (immobilization). Compared to goal, these are uncommon.

=== Setup ===
The game begins with an empty board. Gold places the sixteen gold pieces in any configuration on the first and second ranks. Silver then places the sixteen silver pieces in any configuration on the seventh and eighth ranks. Diagram 1 shows one possible initial placement.

a8	b8	c8	d8	e8	f8	g8	h8
a7	b7	c7	d7	e7	f7	g7	h7
a6	b6	c6 (trap)	d6	e6	f6 (trap)	g6	h6
a5	b5	c5	d5	e5	f5	g5	h5
a4	b4	c4	d4	e4	f4	g4	h4
a3	b3	c3 (trap)	d3	e3	f3 (trap)	g3	h3
a2	b2	c2	d2	e2	f2	g2	h2
a1	b1	c1	d1	e1	f1	g1	h1

Diagram 2
In the diagrammed position, if it were Gold's turn to move, Gold could win in three steps: the dog on a6 can push the rabbit on a7 to a8, moving adjacent to the rabbit on b7, thereby unfreezing it. It can then step to b8 for the victory.

=== Movement ===
After the pieces are placed on the board, the players alternate turns, starting with Gold. A turn consists of making one to four steps. With each step a piece may move into an unoccupied square one space left, right, forward, or backward, except that rabbits may not step backward. The steps of a turn may be made by a single piece or distributed among several pieces in any order.

A turn must make a net change to the position. Thus one cannot, for example, take one step forward and one step back with the same piece, effectively passing the turn and evading zugzwang. Furthermore, one's turn may not create the same position with the same player to move as has been created twice before. This rule is similar to the situational super ko rule in the game of Go, which prevents endless loops, and is in contrast to chess where endless loops are considered draws. The prohibitions on passing and repetition make Arimaa a drawless game.

==== Pushing and pulling ====
The second diagram, from the same game as the initial position above, helps illustrate the remaining rules of movement.

A player may use two consecutive steps of a turn to dislodge an opposing piece with a stronger friendly piece which is adjacent in one of the four cardinal directions. For example, a player's dog may dislodge an opposing rabbit or cat, but not a dog, horse, camel, or elephant. The stronger piece may pull or push the adjacent weaker piece. When pulling, the stronger piece steps into an empty square, and the square it came from is occupied by the weaker piece. The silver elephant on d5 could step to d4 (or c5 or e5) and pull the gold horse from d6 to d5. When pushing, the weaker piece is moved to an adjacent empty square, and the square it came from is occupied by the stronger piece. The gold elephant on d3 could push the silver rabbit on d2 to e2 and then occupy d2. Note that the rabbit on d2 can't be pushed to d1, c2, or d3, because those squares are not empty.

Friendly pieces may not be dislodged. Also, a piece may not push and pull simultaneously. For example, the gold elephant on d3 could not simultaneously push the silver rabbit on d2 to e2 and pull the silver rabbit from c3 to d3. An elephant can never be dislodged, since there is nothing stronger.

==== Freezing ====
A piece which is adjacent in any cardinal direction to a stronger opposing piece is frozen, unless it is also adjacent to a friendly piece. Frozen pieces may not be moved by the owner, but may be dislodged by the opponent. A frozen piece can freeze another still weaker piece. The silver rabbit on a7 is frozen, but the one on d2 is able to move because it is adjacent to a silver piece. Similarly the gold rabbit on b7 is frozen, but the gold cat on c1 is not. The dogs on a6 and b6 do not freeze each other because they are of equal strength. An elephant cannot be frozen, since there is nothing stronger, but an elephant can be blockaded.

==== Capturing ====
A piece which enters a trap square is captured and removed from the game unless there is a friendly piece orthogonally adjacent. Silver could move to capture the gold horse on d6 by pushing it to c6 with the elephant on d5. A piece on a trap square is captured when all adjacent friendly pieces move away. Thus if the silver rabbit on c4 and the silver horse on c2 move away, voluntarily or by being dislodged, the silver rabbit on c3 will be captured.

Note that a piece may voluntarily step into a trap square, even if it is thereby captured. Also, the second step of a pulling maneuver is completed even if the piece doing the pulling is captured on the first step. For example, Silver could step the silver rabbit from f4 to g4 (so that it will no longer support pieces at f3), and then step the silver horse from f2 to f3, which captures the horse; the horse's move could still pull the gold rabbit from f1 to f2.

==== Other endgame conditions ====
In addition to bringing a rabbit to the final rank, there are other ways to end a game (their frequency is indicated in parentheses):

- Immobilization: if, at the beginning of its turn, a player cannot make any step because all of its pieces are frozen or blocked, that player loses the game.
- Repetition: if the same position occurs three times, the player who causes the repetition by ending their turn loses the game.
- Draw: if all sixteen rabbits are captured, the game is a draw. (In competition, in order to avoid drawn games, the player who captures the eight opposing rabbits wins the game.)

If an opposing rabbit is dislodged onto its winning rank and then dislodged again off that rank during the same turn, the game continues.

== Strategy and tactics ==
The objective of Arimaa is to advance one rabbit to the opposite edge of the board. The gameplay involves many tactical and strategic considerations such as the importance to maintain balanced piece distribution across the board. Concentrating all your strong pieces on one side leaves the opposite trap square vulnerable to takeover. Players often keep open communication lines between their pieces, avoiding isolated columns that allow enemy rabbits to slip through uncontested.

Material considerations matter less in Arimaa than in similar games like Chess. Sacrificing pieces to advance a rabbit into an unstoppable position is a sound strategy. It is also important to avoid complete immobilization of your pieces. If all your pieces become frozen or boxed in with no legal moves, you lose immediately.

For beginning insights into good play, see the Arimaa Wikibook. Karl Juhnke, twice Arimaa world champion, has written a book titled Beginning Arimaa which gives an introduction to Arimaa tactics and strategies. Also Jean Daligault, six time Arimaa world champion, wrote Arimaa Strategies and Tactics which is geared towards those who have started playing Arimaa and want to improve their game.

=== Piece strength and the elephant ===

a8	b8	c8	d8	e8	f8	g8	h8
a7	b7	c7	d7	e7	f7	g7	h7
a6	b6	c6 (trap)	d6	e6	f6 (trap)	g6	h6
a5	b5	c5	d5	e5	f5	g5	h5
a4	b4	c4	d4	e4	f4	g4	h4
a3	b3	c3 (trap)	d3	e3	f3 (trap)	g3	h3
a2	b2	c2	d2	e2	f2	g2	h2
a1	b1	c1	d1	e1	f1	g1	h1

The Silver elephant has been blockaded on c1 and cannot move

Understanding the strength ladder is fundamental to Arimaa strategy. The elephant reigns supreme. While it cannot be captured, its true value lies in how it is deployed. An aggressive elephant can dominate the board, forcing weaker enemy pieces to scatter or face removal through trap squares. Alternatively, a defensive elephant creates protected corridors for your rabbits by freezing any opponent piece that threatens your advance. Maintaining central control with your elephant by positioning it near the board's center four squares allows rapid response to threats across all four trap squares.

An important tactic is limiting the mobility of the opponent's elephant, and ideally, performing an elephant blockade. This is done by completely surrounding an elephant with multiple pieces on all four sides so it cannot push its way out. The corners are particularly deadly for elephants since they can be more easily blockaded with a smaller number of pieces.

Since the camel is the second-strongest piece it should be protected vigilantly. Losing the camel significantly weakens a player's tactical options. One powerful tactic is taking an opponent's camel hostage with a centrally located elephant. A hostage camel significantly weakens the enemy position.

=== Trap squares ===
The four trap squares (located at c3, f3, c6, and f6) define Arimaa's unique capturing system. Arimaa requires deliberately maneuvering opponents into these traps by pushing or pulling a weaker piece. Any piece occupying a trap square immediately perishes unless a friendly piece stands adjacent to provide support. This system creates several tactical opportunities and threats.

Before finalizing any move, it is imperative to analyze all four trap squares and how all pieces nearby can be captured or protected. Two pieces positioned next to the same trap can provide mutual protection. If one gets pushed into the trap, the other keeps it alive. However, there are cases of false protection when both supporting pieces are frozen by stronger enemy pieces nearby. Then an opponent can separate them and claim the trap. The most common beginner mistakes are trap blunders which occur when players fail to notice an opponent can capture their piece on the following turn. Developing trap awareness prevents costly losses and reveals opportunities to threaten enemy pieces.

=== The freeze mechanic ===
When your piece stands adjacent to a stronger opponent piece without friendly support nearby, it becomes frozen and cannot move independently. However, positioning any friendly piece, even a rabbit, adjacent to the frozen piece restores its mobility. This creates interesting tactical dynamics. Stronger pieces can lock down multiple enemy pieces simultaneously through strategic positioning. Conversely, advancing pieces in groups rather than isolation prevents them from becoming easy freeze targets. The freeze mechanic particularly impacts rabbit advancement since an enemy cat can halt your rabbit's progress, forcing you to spend extra movement steps bringing supporting pieces forward.

=== Rabbit Management ===
Though winning requires getting just one rabbit across, managing all eight rabbits demands careful attention. Advancing too many rabbits early creates congestion, blocking your stronger pieces, and leaves the rabbits vulnerable to easy capture. Conversely, advancing too few rabbits leaves you with less opportunities for victory. The current recommended approach involves advancing one or two rabbits along the board edges where they're harder to intercept. Keep stronger pieces ahead of advancing rabbits for protection. Rabbits wandering alone become easy targets for enemy pulls into trap squares. Early in the game, maintain most rabbits on your back rank, forming a defensive wall.

As stronger pieces leave the board through captures, rabbits gain mobility. In the mid-game and endgame, when there is less material on the board, one must be alert for "rocket rabbits" which can rush forward. A rabbit on your fourth rank can sprint directly to victory in a single four-step turn if unopposed. Thus, to prevent goal blunders near the endgame, players must keep all passed rabbits (rabbits that have advanced into the fourth rank or beyond) in mind and make sure to block them or push them back. Avoiding open columns is one key element of preventing enemy rabbits from making a goal.

=== Other tactics ===

a8	b8	c8	d8	e8	f8	g8	h8
a7	b7	c7	d7	e7	f7	g7	h7
a6	b6	c6 (trap)	d6	e6	f6 (trap)	g6	h6
a5	b5	c5	d5	e5	f5	g5	h5
a4	b4	c4	d4	e4	f4	g4	h4
a3	b3	c3 (trap)	d3	e3	f3 (trap)	g3	h3
a2	b2	c2	d2	e2	f2	g2	h2
a1	b1	c1	d1	e1	f1	g1	h1

The silver camel on a3 has been taken hostage by the gold elephant on b3

"Danglers" are non-elephant pieces that advance beyond your third rank alone and without support. These pieces become vulnerable to enemy pulls toward their side of the board. Avoid creating danglers by advancing pieces past the third row unless you have a plan to support them.

"Hostage-taking" occurs when you freeze or block an enemy piece near a trap, and threaten to capture it within four steps. This forces your opponent to commit a piece that is as strong as the hostage taker piece, just to guard the hostage. This tactic ties up two of the opposing pieces with just one piece. Furthermore, a "hostage fork" is when a piece is taken hostage in between two traps, and can taken out of the game from either direction in four move steps. This can be used to draw your opponent to bring up other pieces to save the hostage, which can then be taken hostage or blocked as well.

"Framing" can be used to restrict the movement of stronger opposing pieces by trapping a weaker piece.

Trap control involves positioning two or more strong pieces around enemy trap squares, dominating that board region. Sometimes trading control of a trap square on one's own side to gain control of an opponent's trap proves advantageous, especially when you have an advanced rabbit nearby. This allows you to better clear the route for your passed rabbit.

== Patent and registered trademark ==
United States USPTO Patent no. 6,981,700 (“No. 6,981,700”) was filed on October 3, 2003, and granted on January 3, 2006, to Omar Syed, who also holds the registered trademark for the name “Arimaa”.

Syed, however, stated that his objective is not to restrict the non-commercial use of the trademark, and therefore he released a license called the "Arimaa Public License," with the intention of "making Arimaa a game in the public domain as much as possible, while still protecting its commercial use." The items covered by the license are the patent and the registered trademark.

== Annual tournaments ==
=== World Championship ===
Each year since 2004 the Arimaa community has held a World Championship tournament. The tournament is played over the Internet and is open to everyone. Past and current world champion title holders are:

- 2004 – Frank Heinemann of Germany
- 2005 – Karl Juhnke of USA
- 2006 – Till Wiechers of Germany
- 2007 – Jean Daligault of France
- 2008 – Karl Juhnke of USA
- 2009 – Jean Daligault of France
- 2010 – Jean Daligault of France
- 2011 – Jean Daligault of France
- 2012 – Hirohumi Takahashi of Japan
- 2013 – Jean Daligault of France
- 2014 – Jean Daligault of France
- 2015 – Mathew Brown of USA
- 2016 – Mathew Brown of USA
- 2017 – Mathew Brown of USA
- 2018 – Matthew Craven of USA
- 2019 – Jerome Richmond of Great Britain
- 2020 – Mathew Brown of USA
- 2021 – Mathew Brown of USA
- 2022 – Jerome Richmond of Great Britain
- 2023 – Mathew Brown of USA
- 2024 – Mathew Brown of USA
- 2025 – Mathew Brown of USA
- 2026 – Mathew Brown of USA

=== World Computer Championship ===
Each year from 2004 to 2015 the Arimaa community held a World Computer Championship tournament. The tournament is played over the Internet and is open to everyone. The current champion is sharp developed by David Wu of the USA. Past computer world champion title holders are:

- 2004 – Bomb developed by David Fotland of USA
- 2005 – Bomb developed by David Fotland of USA
- 2006 – Bomb developed by David Fotland of USA
- 2007 – Bomb developed by David Fotland of USA
- 2008 – Bomb developed by David Fotland of USA
- 2009 – clueless developed by Jeff Bacher of Canada
- 2010 – marwin developed by Mattias Hultgren of Sweden
- 2011 – sharp developed by David Wu of USA
- 2012 – marwin developed by Mattias Hultgren of Sweden
- 2013 – ziltoid developed by Ricardo Barreira of Portugal
- 2014 – sharp developed by David Wu of USA
- 2015 – sharp developed by David Wu of USA

=== Arimaa Challenge ===
The Arimaa Challenge was a cash prize of around $10,000 that was to have been available annually until 2020 for the first computer program to win the human-versus-computer Arimaa challenge. As part of the conditions of the prize, the computer program must run on standard, off-the-shelf hardware.

The Arimaa Challenge was held twelve times, starting in 2004. Following the second match, Syed changed the format to require the software to win two out of three games against each of three players, to reduce the psychological pressure on individual volunteer defenders. Also Syed called for outside sponsorship of the Arimaa Challenge to build a bigger prize fund.

Year	Prize (Note: The history of prize fund pledges is as follows: In 2002 Omar Syed pledged $10,000 until 2020; Prior to 2006 Omar Syed pledged an additional $5,000 until 2010; Prior to 2006 Paul Mertens pledged $2,000 for 2006, $1,500 for 2007, $1,000 for 2008, $500 for 2009, and $250 for 2010; Prior to 2006 Karl Juhnke pledged $500 for 2006; Prior to 2007 Karl Juhnke pledged $600 for 2007; Prior to 2008 Karl Juhnke pledged $1,000 for 2008; Prior to 2009 Karl Juhnke pledged $1,000 for 2009; Prior to 2010 Karl Juhnke pledged $1,000 for 2010; Prior to 2011 Karl Juhnke pledged $1,000 for 2011)	Challenger / Developer	Human Defender (Human Rank) (Note: The listed ranks include inactive players. Among active players only, the 2010 ranks were Magne(3), Scott(9), Dudek(16), the 2011 ranks were Juhnke(3), Clark(5), Hudson(10), the 2012 ranks were the same as listed, the 2013 ranks were Brown(3), Magne(5), Craven(17), the 2014 ranks were Juhnke(2), Schüler(10), and Manual(33), and the 2015 ranks were Daligault(3) and Ruchka(10).)	Result	Notes
2004	$10,000	Bomb / David Fotland	Omar Syed (1)	0–8	Syed gave a rabbit handicap in the last game and won.
2005	$10,000	Bomb / David Fotland	Frank Heinemann (5)	1–7	No handicap games
2006	$17,500	Bomb / David Fotland	Karl Juhnke (1); Greg Magne (2); Paul Mertens (5)	0–3; 0–3; 1–2	Mertens gave a camel handicap in his last game and lost.
2007	$17,100	Bomb / David Fotland	Karl Juhnke (1); Omar Syed (9); Brendan M (12); N Siddiqui (23)	0–3; 0–3; 0–2; 1–0	Juhnke gave handicaps of a dog, a horse, and a camel respectively, and won all three. Syed gave a cat handicap in his last game and won. Siddiqui substituted for Brendan's third game.
2008	$17,000	Bomb / David Fotland	Jean Daligault (2); Greg Magne (3); Mark Mistretta (20); Omar Syed (24)	0–3; 0–3; 0–1; 0–2	No handicap games. Syed substituted for Mistretta's final two games.
2009	$16,500	Clueless / Jeff Bacher	Jean Daligault (1); Karl Juhnke (2); Jan Macura (14); Omar Syed (18)	0–2; 1–2; 1–2; 0–1	Juhnke gave a dog handicap in his second game and lost. Daligault gave a horse handicap in his last game and won. Syed substituted for Daligault's first game.
2010	$16,250	Marwin / Mattias Hultgren	Greg Magne (3); Louis-Daniel Scott (10); Patrick Dudek (23)	0–3; 1–2; 2–1	Scott gave a dog handicap in his second game and lost.
2011	$11,000	Marwin / Mattias Hultgren	Karl Juhnke (3); Gregory Clark (7); Toby Hudson (14)	1–2; 0–3; 0–3	Juhnke gave a cat handicap in his last game and lost.
2012	$11,150	Briareus / Ricardo Barreira	Jean Daligault (1); Hirohumi Takahashi (2); Eric Momsen (5)	0-3; 0-3; 3-0	Takahashi gave a cat handicap in his last game and won.
2013	$11,000	Marwin / Mattias Hultgren	Mathew Brown (4); Greg Magne (6); Matthew Craven (31)	0-3; 0-3; 1-2	Magne gave a cat handicap in his last game and won. Brown gave a horse handicap in his last game and won.
2014	$12,000	Ziltoid / Ricardo Barreira	Karl Juhnke (3); Samuel Schüler (12); Max Manual (73) (Note: Manual was an anti-computer specialist with too few games against human opponents for accurate ranking.)	0-3; 1-2; 1-2	No handicap games.
2015	$12,000	Sharp / David Wu	Mathew Brown (1); Jean Daligault (4); Lev Ruchka (13)	2-1; 2-1; 3-0	David Wu wins the Arimaa Challenge.

In the first five challenge cycles, David Fotland, programmer of Many Faces of Go, won the Arimaa Computer Championship and the right to play for the prize money, only to see his program beaten decisively each year. In 2009 Fotland's program was surpassed by several new programs in the same year, the strongest of which was Clueless by Jeff Bacher. Humanity's margin of dominance over computers appeared to widen each year from 2004 to 2008 as the best human players improved, but the 2009 Arimaa Challenge was more competitive. Clueless became the first bot to win two games of a Challenge match.

In 2010, Mattias Hultgren's bot Marwin edged out Clueless in the computer championship. In the Challenge match Marwin became the first bot to win two out of three games against a single human defender, and also the first bot to win three of the nine games overall. In 2011, however, Marwin won only one of the nine games, and that one having received a material handicap. In 2012 a new challenger, Briareus, became the first program to defeat a top-ten player, sweeping all three games from the fifth-ranked human. In 2013, however, the humans struck back against Marwin, with #4 and #6 each sweeping including a handicap win, and #31 winning two of three games. In 2014, the computer bounced back to win two games, albeit no matches.

In 2015, Sharp made a substantial leap in playing strength. After having scored 6-6 in twelve games against its top two computer rivals the previous year, Sharp went undefeated in the computer tournaments of 2015, including 13-0 against the second- and third-place finishers. Sharp dominated the pre-Challenge screening against human opponents, winning 27 of 29 games. In the Challenge itself, Sharp clinched victory in each of the three mini-matches by winning the first six games, finishing 7-2 overall and winning the Arimaa challenge. Wu published a paper describing the algorithm and most of ICGA Journal Issue 38/1 was dedicated to this topic. The algorithm combined traditional alpha–beta pruning (changing sides every 4 ply) with heuristic functions manually written while analysing human expert games.

After DeepMind's AlphaZero mastered Go, Chess, and Shogi simply by playing itself, Omar Syed announced a $10,000 prize for the creation of such an Arimaa bot which could win a 10-game match against Sharp. This has not yet been done.

== Reception ==
Kenosha News said that "it's a delightful way for a parent and child to spend time together."

== See also ==
- Computer Arimaa
- Baroque chess
- Game complexity
- Anti-computer tactics
- List of chess variants
- Competitions and prizes in artificial intelligence
- List of world championships in mind sports
