= ICGA Journal =

- Discipline: Computer science
- Language: English

Publication details
- Former name: ICCA Journal
- History: 1977–present
- Publisher: IOS Press

Standard abbreviations
- ISO 4: ICGA J.

Indexing
- ISSN: 1389-6911 (print); 2468-2438 (web)

Links
- Journal homepage

The ICGA Journal is a quarterly academic journal published by the International Computer Games Association. It was renamed in 2000. Its previous name was the ICCA Journal of the International Computer Chess Association, which was founded in 1977.

The journal covers computer analysis on two-player games, especially games with perfect information such as chess, checkers, and Go. It has been the primary outlet for publication of articles on solved games, including the development of endgame tablebases in chess and other games. For example, John W. Romein and Henri E. Bal reported in the journal in 2002 that they had solved Awari and, in 2015, David J. Wu reported his solution for the Arimaa Challenge.

From 1983 till 2015 ICGA Journal was edited by Jaap van den Herik.

== See also ==
- Computer chess
