= Timed propositional temporal logic =

In model checking, a field of computer science, timed propositional temporal logic (TPTL) is an extension of propositional linear temporal logic (LTL) in which variables are introduced to measure times between two events. For example, while LTL allows to state that each event p is eventually followed by an event q, TPTL furthermore allows to give a time limit for q to occur.

== Syntax ==
The future fragment of TPTL is defined similarly to linear temporal logic, in which furthermore, clock variables can be introduced and compared to constants. Formally, given a set $X$ of clocks, MTL is built up from:

- a finite set of propositional variables AP,
- the logical operators ¬ and ∨, and
- the temporal modal operator U,
- a clock comparison $x\sim c$, with $x\in X$, $c$ a number and $\sim$ a comparison operator such as <, ≤, =, ≥ or >.
- a freeze quantification operator $x.\phi$, for $\phi$ a TPTL formula with set of clocks $X\cup\{x\}$.

Furthermore, for $I=(a,b)$ an interval, $x\in I$ is considered as an abbreviation for $x>a\land x<b$; and similarly for every other kind of intervals.

The logic TPTL+Past is built as the future fragment of TLS and also contains

- the temporal modal operator S.

The next operator N is not considered to be a part of MTL syntax. It will instead be defined from other operators.

A closed formula is a formula over an empty set of clocks.

== Models ==
Let $T\subseteq\mathbb R_+$, which intuitively represents a set of times. Let $\gamma: T\to \mathcal P(AP)$ a function that associates to each moment $t\in T$ a set of propositions from AP. A model of a TPTL formula is such a function $\gamma$. Usually, $\gamma$ is either a timed word or a signal. In those cases, $T$ is either a discrete subset or an interval containing 0.

== Semantics ==
Let $T$ and $\gamma$ be as above. Let $X$ be a set of clocks. Let $\nu:X\to\mathbb R_{\ge0}$ (a clock valuation over $X$).

We are now going to explain what it means for a TPTL formula $\phi$ to hold at time $t$ for a valuation $\nu$. This is denoted by $\gamma,t,\nu\models\phi$. Let $\phi$ and $\psi$ be two formulas over the set of clocks $X$, $\xi$ a formula over the set of clocks $X\cup\{y\}$, $x\in X$, $l\in\mathtt{AP}$, $c$ a number and $\sim$ being a comparison operator such as <, ≤, =, ≥ or >: We first consider formulas whose main operator also belongs to LTL:

- $\gamma,t,\nu\models l$ holds if $l\in\gamma(t)$,
- $\gamma,t,\nu\models\neg\phi$ holds if $\gamma,t,\nu\not\models\phi$
- $\gamma,t,\nu\models\phi\lor\psi$ holds if either $\gamma,t,\nu\models\phi$ or $\gamma,t,\nu\models\psi$, or both
- $\gamma,t,\nu\models\phi\mathbin\mathcal U\psi$ holds if there exists $t''$ such that $t<t''$ and $\gamma,t'',\nu\models\psi$ and for each $t'$ with $t< t'< t''$, $\gamma,t',\nu\models\phi$,
- $\gamma,t,\nu\models\phi\mathbin\mathcal S\psi$ holds if there exists $t''$ such that $t''< t$ and $\gamma,t'',\nu\models\psi$ and for each $t'$ with $t''<t'<t$, $\gamma,t',\nu\models\phi$,
- $\gamma,t,\nu\models x\sim c$ holds if $t-\nu(y)\sim c$,
- $\gamma,t,\nu\models y.\xi$ holds if $\gamma,t,\nu[y\to t]\models\phi$ holds.

== Metric temporal logic ==
Metric temporal logic is another extension of LTL that allows measurement of time. Instead of adding variables, it adds an infinity of operators $\mathcal U_I$ and $\mathcal S_I$ for $I$ an interval of non-negative numbers. The semantics of the formula $\phi \mathbin\mathcal {U_I}\psi$ at some time $t$ is essentially the same than the semantics of the formula $\phi \mathbin\mathcal U\psi$, with the constraints that the time $t''$ at which $\psi$ must hold occurs in the interval $t+I$.

TPTL is as least as expressive as MTL. Indeed, the MTL formula $\phi\mathbin\mathcal {U_I}\psi$ is equivalent to the TPTL formula $x.\phi\mathcal(x\in I\land\psi)$ where $x$ is a new variable.

It follows that any other operator introduced in the page MTL, such as $\Box$ and $\Diamond$ can also be defined as TPTL formulas.

TPTL is strictly more expressive than MTL both over timed words and over signals. Over timed words, no MTL formula is equivalent to $\Box(a\implies x.\Diamond(b\land\Diamond(c\land x\le 5)))$. Over signal, there are no MTL formula equivalent to $x.\Diamond(a\land x\le 1\land\Box(x\le 1\implies\neg b))$, which states that the last atomic proposition before time point 1 is an $a$.

== Comparison with LTL ==
A standard (untimed) infinite word $w=a_0,a_1,\dots,$ is a function from $\mathbb N$ to $A$. We can consider such a word using the set of time $T=\mathbb N$, and the function $\gamma(i)=a_i$. In this case, for $\phi$ an arbitrary LTL formula, $w,i\models\phi$ if and only if $\gamma,i,\nu\models\phi$, where $\phi$ is considered as a TPTL formula with non-strict operator, and $\nu$ is the only function defined on the empty set.
