= Ocata =

Ocata may refer to:

- Ocata Therapeutics, a stem cell therapy research center
- One clock alternating timed automation, a type of automata
