= Lazy linear hybrid automaton =

Lazy linear hybrid automata model the discrete time behavior of control systems containing finite-precision sensors and actuators interacting with their environment under bounded inertial delays. The model permits only linear flow constraints but the invariants and guards can be any computable function.

This computational model was proposed by Manindra Agrawal and P. S. Thiagarajan. This model is more realistic and also computationally amenable than the currently popular modeling paradigm of linear hybrid automaton.
