= Emptiness problem =

In theoretical computer science and formal language theory, a formal language is empty if its set of valid sentences is the empty set. The emptiness problem is the question of determining whether a language is empty given some representation of it, such as a finite-state automaton. For an automaton having $n$ states, this is a decision problem that can be solved in $O(n^2)$ time, or in time $O(n+m)$ if the automaton has n states and m transitions. However, variants of that question, such as the emptiness problem for non-erasing stack automata, are PSPACE-complete. The emptiness problem in machine learning and formal languages determines if a model or automaton generates the empty language, which is undecidable for certain alternating multi-head finite automata over single-letter alphabets.

The emptiness problem is undecidable for context-sensitive grammars, a fact that follows from the undecidability of the halting problem. It is, however, decidable for context-free grammars.

== See also ==
- Intersection non-emptiness problem
