= S2P (complexity) =

In computational complexity theory, S^{P}_{2} is a complexity class, intermediate between the first and second levels of the polynomial hierarchy. A language L is in $\mathsf S_2^P$ if there exists a polynomial-time predicate P such that

- If $x \in L$, then there exists a y such that for all z, $P(x,y,z)=1$,
- If $x \notin L$, then there exists a z such that for all y, $P(x,y,z)=0$,

where size of y and z must be polynomial of x.

== Relationship to other complexity classes ==
It is immediate from the definition that S^{P}_{2} is closed under unions, intersections, and complements. Comparing the definition with that of $\Sigma_{2}^P$ and $\Pi_{2}^P$, it also follows immediately that S^{P}_{2} is contained in $\Sigma_{2}^P \cap \Pi_{2}^P$. This inclusion can in fact be strengthened to ZPP^{NP}.

Every language in NP also belongs to S^{P}_{2}. For by definition, a language L is in NP, if and only if there exists a polynomial-time verifier V(x,y), such that for every x in L there exists y for which V answers true, and such that for every x not in L, V always answers false. But such a verifier can easily be transformed into an S^{P}_{2} predicate P(x,y,z) for the same language that ignores z and otherwise behaves the same as V. By the same token, co-NP belongs to S^{P}_{2}. These straightforward inclusions can be strengthened to show that the class S^{P}_{2} contains MA (by a generalization of the Sipser–Lautemann theorem) and $\Delta_{2}^P$ (more generally, $P^{\mathsf S_2^P}=\mathsf S_2^P$).

== Karp–Lipton theorem ==
A version of Karp–Lipton theorem states that if every language in NP has polynomial size circuits then the polynomial time hierarchy collapses to S^{P}_{2}. This result yields a strengthening of Kannan's theorem: it is known that S^{P}_{2} is not contained in SIZE(n^{k}) for any fixed k.

== Symmetric hierarchy ==
As an extension, it is possible to define $\mathsf S_2$ as an operator on complexity classes; then $\mathsf S_2 P = \mathsf S_2^P$. Iteration of $S_2$ operator yields a "symmetric hierarchy"; the union of the classes produced in this way is equal to the Polynomial hierarchy.
