= Boolean satisfiability problem =

Problem of determining if a Boolean formula could be made true

In logic and computer science, the Boolean satisfiability problem (sometimes called propositional satisfiability problem and abbreviated SATISFIABILITY, SAT or B-SAT) asks whether there exists an interpretation that satisfies a given Boolean formula. In other words, it asks whether the formula's variables can be consistently replaced by the values TRUE or FALSE to make the formula evaluate to TRUE. If this is the case, the formula is called satisfiable, else unsatisfiable. For example, the formula "a AND NOT b" is satisfiable because one can find the values a = TRUE and b = FALSE, which make (a AND NOT b) = TRUE. In contrast, "a AND NOT a" is unsatisfiable.

SAT is the first problem that was proven to be NP-complete – this is the Cook–Levin theorem. This means that all problems in the complexity class NP, which includes a wide range of natural decision and optimization problems, are at most as difficult to solve as SAT. There is no known algorithm that efficiently solves each SAT problem (where "efficiently" means "deterministically in polynomial time"). Although such an algorithm is generally believed not to exist, this belief has not been proven or disproven mathematically. Resolving the question of whether SAT has a polynomial-time algorithm would settle the P versus NP problem – one of the most important open problems in the theory of computing.

Nevertheless, heuristic SAT-algorithms are able to solve problem instances involving tens of thousands of variables and formulas consisting of millions of symbols, which is sufficient for many practical SAT problems occurring in artificial intelligence, circuit design, and automatic theorem proving.

== Definitions ==
A propositional logic formula, also called Boolean expression, is built from variables, operators AND (conjunction, also denoted by ∧), OR (disjunction, ∨), NOT (negation, ¬), and parentheses. A formula is said to be satisfiable if it can be made TRUE by assigning appropriate logical values (i.e. TRUE, FALSE) to its variables. The Boolean satisfiability problem (SAT) is, given a formula, to check whether it is satisfiable. This decision problem is of central importance in many areas of computer science, including theoretical computer science, complexity theory, algorithmics, cryptography and artificial intelligence.

=== Conjunctive normal form ===
A literal is either a variable (in which case it is called a positive literal) or the negation of a variable (called a negative literal). A clause is a disjunction of literals (or a single literal). A clause is called a Horn clause if it contains at most one positive literal. A formula is in conjunctive normal form (CNF) if it is a conjunction of clauses (or a single clause).

For example, x_{1} is a positive literal, ¬x_{2} is a negative literal, and x_{1} ∨ ¬x_{2} is a clause. The formula (x_{1} ∨ ¬x_{2}) ∧ (¬x_{1} ∨ x_{2} ∨ x_{3}) ∧ ¬x_{1} is in conjunctive normal form; its first and third clauses are Horn clauses, but its second clause is not. The formula is satisfiable, by choosing x_{1} = FALSE, x_{2} = FALSE, and x_{3} arbitrarily, since (FALSE ∨ ¬FALSE) ∧ (¬FALSE ∨ FALSE ∨ x_{3}) ∧ ¬FALSE evaluates to (FALSE ∨ TRUE) ∧ (TRUE ∨ FALSE ∨ x_{3}) ∧ TRUE, and in turn to TRUE ∧ TRUE ∧ TRUE (i.e. to TRUE). In contrast, the CNF formula a ∧ ¬a, consisting of two clauses of one literal, is unsatisfiable, since for a=TRUE or a=FALSE it evaluates to TRUE ∧ ¬TRUE (i.e., FALSE) or FALSE ∧ ¬FALSE (i.e., again FALSE), respectively.

For some versions of the SAT problem, it is useful to define the notion of a generalized conjunctive normal form formula, viz. as a conjunction of arbitrarily many generalized clauses, the latter being of the form R(l_{1},...,l_{n}) for some Boolean function R and (ordinary) literals l_{i}. Different sets of allowed Boolean functions lead to different problem versions. As an example, R(¬x,a,b) is a generalized clause, and R(¬x,a,b) ∧ R(b,y,c) ∧ R(c,d,¬z) is a generalized conjunctive normal form. This formula is used below, with R being the ternary operator that is TRUE just when exactly one of its arguments is.

Using the laws of Boolean algebra, every propositional logic formula can be transformed into an equivalent conjunctive normal form, which may, however, be exponentially longer. For example, transforming the formula (x_{1}∧y_{1}) ∨ (x_{2}∧y_{2}) ∨ ... ∨ (x_{n}∧y_{n}) into conjunctive normal form yields

(x_{1} ∨ x_{2} ∨ … ∨ x_{n}) ∧
(y_{1} ∨ x_{2} ∨ … ∨ x_{n}) ∧
(x_{1} ∨ y_{2} ∨ … ∨ x_{n}) ∧
(y_{1} ∨ y_{2} ∨ … ∨ x_{n}) ∧
... ∧
(x_{1} ∨ x_{2} ∨ … ∨ y_{n}) ∧
(y_{1} ∨ x_{2} ∨ … ∨ y_{n}) ∧
(x_{1} ∨ y_{2} ∨ … ∨ y_{n}) ∧
(y_{1} ∨ y_{2} ∨ … ∨ y_{n});

while the former is a disjunction of n conjunctions of 2 variables, the latter consists of 2^{n} clauses of n variables.

However, with use of the Tseytin transformation, we may find an equisatisfiable conjunctive normal form formula with length linear in the size of the original propositional logic formula.

== Complexity ==
SAT was the first problem known to be NP-complete, as proved by Stephen Cook at the University of Toronto in 1971 and independently by Leonid Levin at the Russian Academy of Sciences in 1973. Until that time, the concept of an NP-complete problem did not even exist. The proof shows how every decision problem in the complexity class NP can be reduced to the SAT problem for CNF (Note: The SAT problem for arbitrary formulas is NP-complete, too, since it is easily shown to be in NP, and it cannot be easier than SAT for CNF formulas.) formulas, sometimes called CNFSAT. A useful property of Cook's reduction is that it preserves the number of accepting answers. For example, deciding whether a given graph has a 3-coloring is another problem in NP; if a graph has 17 valid 3-colorings, then the SAT formula produced by the Cook–Levin reduction will have 17 satisfying assignments.

NP-completeness only refers to the run-time of the worst-case instances. Many of the instances that occur in practical applications can be solved much more quickly, see § Algorithms for solving SAT below.

=== 3-satisfiability ===
The 3-SAT instance (x ∨ x ∨ y) ∧ (¬x ∨ ¬y ∨ ¬y) ∧ (¬x ∨ y ∨ y) reduced to a clique problem. The green vertices form a 3-clique and correspond to the satisfying assignment x = FALSE, y = TRUE.

Like the satisfiability problem for arbitrary formulas, determining the satisfiability of a formula in conjunctive normal form where each clause is limited to at most three literals is NP-complete also; this problem is called 3-SAT, 3CNFSAT, or 3-satisfiability. To reduce the unrestricted SAT problem to 3-SAT, transform each clause l_{1} ∨ ⋯ ∨ l_{n} to a conjunction of n − 2 clauses

(l_{1} ∨ l_{2} ∨ x_{2}) ∧
(¬x_{2} ∨ l_{3} ∨ x_{3}) ∧
(¬x_{3} ∨ l_{4} ∨ x_{4}) ∧
⋯ ∧
(¬x_{n−3} ∨ l_{n−2} ∨ x_{n−2}) ∧
(¬x_{n−2} ∨ l_{n−1} ∨ l_{n}),

where x_{2}, … , x_{n−2} are fresh variables not occurring elsewhere. Although the two formulas are not logically equivalent, they are equisatisfiable. The formula resulting from transforming all clauses is at most 3 times as long as its original; that is, the length growth is polynomial.

3-SAT is one of Karp's 21 NP-complete problems, and it is used as a starting point for proving that other problems are also NP-hard. (Note: I.e. at least as hard as every other problem in NP. A decision problem is NP-complete if and only if it is in NP and is NP-hard.) This is done by polynomial-time reduction from 3-SAT to the other problem. An example of a problem where this method has been used is the clique problem: given a CNF formula consisting of c clauses, the corresponding graph consists of a vertex for each literal, and an edge between each two non-contradicting (Note: I.e. such that one literal is not the negation of the other.) literals from different clauses; see the picture. The graph has a c-clique if and only if the formula is satisfiable.

There is a simple randomized algorithm due to Schöning (1999) that runs in time (4/3)^{n}, where n is the number of variables in the 3-SAT proposition, and succeeds with high probability to correctly decide 3-SAT.

The exponential time hypothesis asserts that no algorithm can solve 3-SAT (or indeed k-SAT for any k > 2) in exp(o(n)) time (that is, fundamentally faster than exponential in n).

Selman, Mitchell, and Levesque (1996) give empirical data on the difficulty of randomly generated 3-SAT formulas, depending on their size parameters. Difficulty is measured in number recursive calls made by a DPLL algorithm. They identified a phase transition region from almost-certainly-satisfiable to almost-certainly-unsatisfiable formulas at the clauses-to-variables ratio at about 4.26.

3-satisfiability can be generalized to k-satisfiability (k-SAT, also k-CNF-SAT), when formulas in CNF are considered with each clause containing up to k literals. However, since for any k ≥ 3, this problem can neither be easier than 3-SAT nor harder than SAT, and the latter two are NP-complete, so must be k-SAT.

Some authors restrict k-SAT to CNF formulas with exactly k literals. This does not lead to a different complexity class either, as each clause with fewer than k literals can be padded with repeated copies of the same literals.

Satisfiability and solution space geometry of k-SAT problems with randomly generated clauses have been investigated statistically. As a function of the clause-to-variable ratio (also known as the density), the model exhibits various phase transitions regarding satisfiability and solution space geometry. For satisfiability, there exists a sharp threshold such that with high probability a solution exists if and only if the density remains below this threshold. Well below the satisfiability threshold, the solution space also undergoes a geometric phase transition, namely that it shatters into exponentially many, well-separated clusters. The onset of this phase transition coincides with the known algorithmic threshold, suggesting a link between geometry and algorithmic intractability.

== Special instances of 3SAT ==
=== Conjunctive normal form ===
Conjunctive normal form (in particular with 3 literals per clause) is often considered the canonical representation for SAT formulas. As shown above, the general SAT problem reduces to 3-SAT, the problem of determining satisfiability for formulas in this form.

=== Linear SAT ===
A 3-SAT formula is Linear SAT (LSAT) if each clause (viewed as a set of literals) intersects at most one other clause, and, moreover, if two clauses intersect, then they have exactly one literal in common. An LSAT formula can be depicted as a set of disjoint semi-closed intervals on a line. Deciding whether an LSAT formula is satisfiable is NP-complete.

=== 2-satisfiability ===
SAT is easier if the number of literals in a clause is limited to at most 2, in which case the problem is called 2-SAT. This problem can be solved in polynomial time, and in fact is complete for the complexity class NL. If additionally all OR operations in literals are changed to XOR operations, then the result is called exclusive-or 2-satisfiability, which is a problem complete for the complexity class SL = L.

=== Horn-satisfiability ===
The problem of deciding the satisfiability of a given conjunction of Horn clauses is called Horn-satisfiability, or HORN-SAT. It can be solved in polynomial time by a single step of the unit propagation algorithm, which produces the single minimal model of the set of Horn clauses (w.r.t. the set of literals assigned to TRUE). Horn-satisfiability is P-complete. It can be seen as P's version of the Boolean satisfiability problem. Also, deciding the truth of quantified Horn formulas can be done in polynomial time.

Horn clauses are of interest because they are able to express implication of one variable from a set of other variables. Indeed, one such clause ¬x_{1} ∨ ... ∨ ¬x_{n} ∨ y can be rewritten as x_{1} ∧ ... ∧ x_{n} → y; that is, if x_{1},...,x_{n} are all TRUE, then y must be TRUE as well.

A generalization of the class of Horn formulas is that of renameable-Horn formulae, which is the set of formulas that can be placed in Horn form by replacing some variables with their respective negation. For example, (x_{1} ∨ ¬x_{2}) ∧ (¬x_{1} ∨ x_{2} ∨ x_{3}) ∧ ¬x_{1} is not a Horn formula, but can be renamed to the Horn formula (x_{1} ∨ ¬x_{2}) ∧ (¬x_{1} ∨ x_{2} ∨ ¬y_{3}) ∧ ¬x_{1} by introducing y_{3} as negation of x_{3}. In contrast, no renaming of (x_{1} ∨ ¬x_{2} ∨ ¬x_{3}) ∧ (¬x_{1} ∨ x_{2} ∨ x_{3}) ∧ ¬x_{1} leads to a Horn formula. Checking the existence of such a replacement can be done in linear time; therefore, the satisfiability of such formulae is in P as it can be solved by first performing this replacement and then checking the satisfiability of the resulting Horn formula.

== Not 3SAT problems ==
=== Disjunctive normal form ===
SAT is trivial if the formulas are restricted to those in disjunctive normal form, that is, they are a disjunction of conjunctions of literals. Such a formula is indeed satisfiable if and only if at least one of its conjunctions is satisfiable, and a conjunction is satisfiable if and only if it does not contain both x and NOT x for some variable x. This can be checked in linear time. Furthermore, if they are restricted to being in full disjunctive normal form, in which every variable appears exactly once in every conjunction, they can be checked in constant time (each conjunction represents one satisfying assignment). But it can take exponential time and space to convert a general SAT problem to disjunctive normal form; to obtain an example, exchange "∧" and "∨" in the above exponential blow-up example for conjunctive normal forms.

=== Exactly-1 3-satisfiability ===
Another NP-complete variant of the 3-satisfiability problem is the one-in-three 3-SAT (also known variously as 1-in-3-SAT and exactly-1 3-SAT). Given a conjunctive normal form with three literals per clause, the problem is to determine whether there exists a truth assignment to the variables so that each clause has exactly one TRUE literal (and thus exactly two FALSE literals).

=== Not-all-equal 3-satisfiability ===
Another variant is the not-all-equal 3-satisfiability problem (also called NAE3SAT). Given a conjunctive normal form with three literals per clause, the problem is to determine if an assignment to the variables exists such that in no clause all three literals have the same truth value. This problem is NP-complete, too, even if no negation symbols are admitted, by Schaefer's dichotomy theorem.

=== XOR-satisfiability ===
Another special case is the class of problems where each clause contains XOR (i.e. exclusive or) rather than (plain) OR operators. This is in P, since an XOR-SAT formula can also be viewed as a system of linear equations mod 2, and can be solved in cubic time by Gaussian elimination.

== Schaefer's dichotomy theorem ==
The restrictions above (CNF, 2CNF, 3CNF, Horn, XOR-SAT) bound the considered formulae to be conjunctions of subformulas; each restriction states a specific form for all subformulas: for example, only binary clauses can be subformulas in 2CNF.

Schaefer's dichotomy theorem states that, for any restriction to Boolean functions that can be used to form these subformulas, the corresponding satisfiability problem is in P or NP-complete. The membership in P of the satisfiability of 2CNF, Horn, and XOR-SAT formulae are special cases of this theorem.

The following table summarizes some common variants of SAT.

Name	Code	3SAT problem?	Restrictions	Requirements	Class
3-satisfiability	3SAT	Yes	Each clause contains 3 literals.	At least one literal must be true.	NP-c
2-satisfiability	2SAT	Yes	Each clause contains 2 literals.	At least one literal must be true.	NL-c
Exactly-1 3-SAT	1-in-3-SAT	No	Each clause contains 3 literals.	Exactly one literal must be true.	NP-c
Exactly-1 Positive 3-SAT	1-in-3-SAT+	No	Each clause contains 3 positive literals.	Exactly one literal must be true.	NP-c
Not-all-equal 3-satisfiability	NAE3SAT	No	Each clause contains 3 literals.	Either one or two literals must be true.	NP-c
Not-all-equal positive 3-SAT	NAE3SAT+	No	Each clause contains 3 positive literals.	Either one or two literals must be true.	NP-c
Planar SAT	PL-SAT	Yes	The incidence graph (clause-variable graph) is planar.	At least one literal must be true.	NP-c
Linear SAT	LSAT	Yes	Each clause contains 3 literals, intersects at most one other clause, and the intersection is exactly one literal.	At least one literal must be true.	NP-c
Horn satisfiability	HORN-SAT	Yes	Horn clauses (at most one positive literal).	At least one literal must be true.	P-c
Xor satisfiability	XOR-SAT	No	Each clause contains XOR operations rather than OR.	The XOR of all literals must be true.	P

== Extensions of SAT ==
An extension that has gained significant popularity since 2003 is satisfiability modulo theories (SMT) that can enrich CNF formulas with linear constraints, arrays, all-different constraints, uninterpreted functions, etc. Such extensions typically remain NP-complete, but very efficient solvers are now available that can handle many such kinds of constraints.

The satisfiability problem becomes more difficult if both "for all" (∀) and "there exists" (∃) quantifiers are allowed to bind the Boolean variables. An example of such an expression would be ∀x ∀y ∃z (x ∨ y ∨ z) ∧ (¬x ∨ ¬y ∨ ¬z); it is valid, since for all values of x and y, an appropriate value of z can be found, viz. z=TRUE if both x and y are FALSE, and z=FALSE else. SAT itself (tacitly) uses only ∃ quantifiers. If only ∀ quantifiers are allowed instead, the so-called tautology problem is obtained, which is co-NP-complete. If any number of both quantifiers are allowed, the problem is called the quantified Boolean formula problem (QBF), which can be shown to be PSPACE-complete. It is widely believed that PSPACE-complete problems are strictly harder than any problem in NP, although this has not yet been proved.

Ordinary SAT asks if there is at least one variable assignment that makes the formula true. A variety of variants deal with the number of such assignments:

- MAJ-SAT asks if at least half of all assignments make the formula TRUE. It is known to be complete for PP, a probabilistic class. Surprisingly, MAJ-kSAT is demonstrated to be in P for every finite integer k.
- #SAT, the problem of counting how many variable assignments satisfy a formula, is a counting problem, not a decision problem, and is #P-complete.
- UNIQUE SAT is the problem of determining whether a formula has exactly one assignment. It is complete for US, the complexity class describing problems solvable by a non-deterministic polynomial time Turing machine that accepts when there is exactly one nondeterministic accepting path and rejects otherwise.
- UNAMBIGUOUS-SAT is the name given to the satisfiability problem when the input formula is promised to have at most one satisfying assignment. The problem is also called USAT. A solving algorithm for UNAMBIGUOUS-SAT is allowed to exhibit any behavior, including endless looping, on a formula having several satisfying assignments. Although this problem seems easier, Valiant and Vazirani have shown that if there is a practical (i.e. randomized polynomial-time) algorithm to solve it, then all problems in NP can be solved just as easily.
- MAX-SAT, the maximum satisfiability problem, is an FNP generalization of SAT. It asks for the maximum number of clauses which can be satisfied by any assignment. It has efficient approximation algorithms, but is NP-hard to solve exactly. Worse still, it is APX-complete, meaning there is no polynomial-time approximation scheme (PTAS) for this problem unless P=NP.
- WMSAT is the problem of finding an assignment of minimum weight that satisfy a monotone Boolean formula (i.e. a formula without any negation). Weights of propositional variables are given in the input of the problem. The weight of an assignment is the sum of weights of true variables. That problem is NP-complete (see Th. 1 of).

Other generalizations include satisfiability for first- and second-order logic, constraint satisfaction problems, 0-1 integer programming.

== Finding a satisfying assignment ==
While SAT is a decision problem, the search problem of finding a satisfying assignment reduces to SAT. That is, each algorithm which correctly answers whether an instance of SAT is solvable can be used to find a satisfying assignment. First, the question is asked on the given formula Φ. If the answer is "no", the formula is unsatisfiable. Otherwise, the question is asked on the partly instantiated formula Φ{x_{1}=TRUE}, that is, Φ with the first variable x_{1} replaced by TRUE, and simplified accordingly. If the answer is "yes", then x_{1}=TRUE, otherwise x_{1}=FALSE. Values of other variables can be found subsequently in the same way. In total, n+1 runs of the algorithm are required, where n is the number of distinct variables in Φ.

This property is used in several theorems in complexity theory:

- NP ⊆ P/poly ⇒ PH = Σ_{2} (Karp–Lipton theorem)
- NP ⊆ BPP ⇒ NP = RP
- P = NP ⇒ FP = FNP

== Algorithms for solving SAT ==
Exponential complexity of SAT solving vs variable count, clause count, and formula length

As of September 2026, only SAT algorithms with exponential worst-case complexity are known. In spite of this, efficient and scalable algorithms for SAT were developed during the 2000s and have contributed to dramatic advances in the ability to automatically solve problem instances involving tens of thousands of variables and millions of constraints (i.e. clauses). Examples of such problems include formal equivalence checking, model checking, formal verification of pipelined microprocessors, automatic test pattern generation, routing of FPGAs, planning, and scheduling problems, and so on. A SAT-solving engine is also considered to be an essential component in the electronic design automation toolbox.

Major techniques used by modern SAT solvers include the Davis–Putnam–Logemann–Loveland algorithm (or DPLL), conflict-driven clause learning (CDCL), and stochastic local search algorithms such as WalkSAT. Almost all SAT solvers include time-outs, so they will terminate in reasonable time even if they cannot find a solution. Different SAT solvers will find different instances easy or hard, and some excel at proving unsatisfiability, and others at finding solutions. Recent attempts have been made to learn an instance's satisfiability using deep learning techniques.

SAT solvers are developed and compared in SAT-solving contests. Modern SAT solvers are also having significant impact on the fields of software verification, constraint solving in artificial intelligence, and operations research, among others.

Theoretical algorithms with increasingly better worst-case runtime guarantees have been given in the last decades, including an $O^*(1.0638^L)$ algorithm for clause sets of length (total literal count) $L$, an $O^*(1.2226^m)$ algorithm for sets of $m$ clauses, and an $O^*(1.32793^n)$ algorithm for 3-SAT with $n$ variables. Here, the notation "$O^*(.)$" means "up to a polynomial factor", i.e. $O^*(f(n)) = O(f(n)n^{O(1)})$. Earlier runtime guarantees are shown in the diagram.

== See also ==
- Unsatisfiable core
- Satisfiability modulo theories
- Counting SAT
- Planar SAT
- Karloff–Zwick algorithm
- Circuit satisfiability

== Sources ==
- This article includes material from https://web.archive.org/web/20070708233347/http://www.sigda.org/newsletter/2006/eNews_061201.html by Prof. Karem A. Sakallah.
