= COAM =

COAM may refer to:

- The Chiltern Open Air Museum, a museum in Buckinghamshire, England
- Corruption of a Minor, a legal term referring to statutory rape
- CoAM, an abbreviation in computer science for the Arthur–Merlin protocol
