= Unsatisfiable core =

Concept in the Boolean satisfiability problem

In mathematical logic, given an unsatisfiable Boolean propositional formula in conjunctive normal form, a subset of clauses whose conjunction is still unsatisfiable is called an unsatisfiable core of the original formula.

Many SAT solvers can produce a resolution graph which proves the unsatisfiability of the original problem. This can be analyzed to produce a smaller unsatisfiable core.

An unsatisfiable core is called a minimal unsatisfiable core, if every proper subset (allowing removal of any arbitrary clause or clauses) of it is satisfiable. Thus, such a core is a local minimum, though not necessarily a global one. There are several practical methods of computing minimal unsatisfiable cores.

A minimum unsatisfiable core contains the smallest number of the original clauses required to still be unsatisfiable. No practical algorithms for computing the minimum unsatisfiable core are known, and computing a minimum unsatisfiable core of an input formula in conjunctive normal form is a $\Sigma_2^\mathsf{P}$-complete problem. Notice the terminology: whereas the minimal unsatisfiable core was a local problem with an easy solution, the minimum unsatisfiable core is a global problem with no known easy solution.
