= Michael Sipser =

American theoretical computer scientist (born 1954)

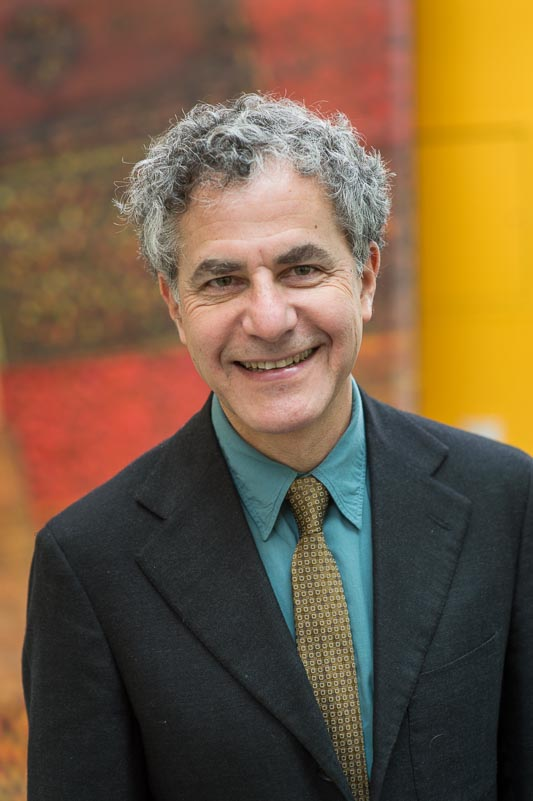
- Born: Michael Fredric Sipser; September 17, 1954 (age 71); Brooklyn, New York
- Education: Cornell University; University of California at Berkeley
- Awards: Fellow, American Academy of Arts and Sciences; Fellow, American Mathematical Society; Fellow, Association for Computing Machinery
- Scientific career
- Fields: Mathematics; Computer Science
- Workplaces: MIT
- Thesis: Nondeterminism and the Size of Two-Way Finite Automata (1980)
- Doctoral advisor: Manuel Blum
- Doctoral students: Lance Fortnow; Sofya Raskhodnikova; Leonard Schulman; Daniel Spielman; Andrew Sutherland; Yiqun Lisa Yin
- Website: math.mit.edu/~sipser/

Michael Fredric Sipser (born September 17, 1954) is an American theoretical computer scientist who has made early contributions to computational complexity theory. He is a professor of applied mathematics and was the dean of science at the Massachusetts Institute of Technology.

== Biography ==
Sipser was born and raised in Brooklyn, New York and moved to Oswego, New York when he was 12 years old. His grandparents were Jewish immigrants from Eastern Europe and his father was a professor of mathematics at SUNY Oneonta. He earned his BA in mathematics from Cornell University in 1974 and his PhD in engineering from the University of California at Berkeley in 1980 under the direction of Manuel Blum.

He joined MIT's Laboratory for Computer Science as a research associate in 1979 and then was a Research Staff Member at IBM Research in San Jose. In 1980, he joined the MIT faculty. He spent the 1985–1986 academic year on the faculty of the University of California at Berkeley and then returned to MIT. From 2004 until 2014, he served as head of the MIT Mathematics department. He was appointed Interim Dean of the MIT School of Science in 2013 and Dean in 2014. He served as Dean until 2020, when he was succeeded by Nergis Mavalvala. He is a fellow of the American Academy of Arts and Sciences. In 2015 he was elected as a fellow of the American Mathematical Society "for contributions to complexity theory and for leadership and service to the mathematical community." He was elected as an ACM Fellow in 2017.

== Scientific career ==
Sipser specializes in algorithms and complexity theory, specifically efficient error correcting codes, interactive proof systems, randomness, quantum computation, and establishing the inherent computational difficulty of problems. He introduced the method of probabilistic restriction for proving super-polynomial lower bounds on circuit complexity in a paper joint with Merrick Furst and James B. Saxe. Their result was later improved to be an exponential lower bound by Andrew Yao and Johan Håstad.

In an early derandomization theorem, Sipser showed that BPP is contained in the polynomial hierarchy, subsequently improved by Peter Gács and Clemens Lautemann to form what is now known as the Sipser–Gács–Lautemann theorem. Sipser also established a connection between expander graphs and derandomization. He and his PhD student Daniel Spielman introduced expander codes, an application of expander graphs. With fellow graduate student David Lichtenstein, Sipser proved that Go is PSPACE hard.

In quantum computation theory, he introduced the adiabatic algorithm jointly with Edward Farhi, Jeffrey Goldstone, and Samuel Gutmann.

Sipser has long been interested in the P versus NP problem. In 1975, he wagered an ounce of gold with Leonard Adleman that the problem would be solved with a proof that P ≠ NP by the end of the 20th century. Sipser sent Adleman an American Gold Eagle coin in 2000 because the problem remained (and remains) unsolved.

== Notable books ==
Sipser is the author of Introduction to the Theory of Computation, a textbook for theoretical computer science.

== Personal life ==
Sipser lives in Cambridge, Massachusetts with his wife, Ina, and has two children: a daughter, Rachel, who graduated from New York University, and a younger son, Aaron, who graduated from MIT.
