= Co-NP-complete =

Complexity class

In complexity theory, computational problems that are co-NP-complete are those that are the hardest problems in co-NP, in the sense that any problem in co-NP can be reformulated as a special case of any co-NP-complete problem with only polynomial overhead. If P is different from co-NP, then all of the co-NP-complete problems are not solvable in polynomial time. If there exists a way to solve a co-NP-complete problem quickly, then that algorithm can be used to solve all co-NP problems quickly.

The concept is of particular interest in the study of the P=NP problem, and in NP-completeness. See co-NP and NP-complete for more details.

== Definition ==
A decision problem C is co-NP-complete if it is in co-NP and if every problem in co-NP is polynomial-time many-one reducible to it. This means that for every co-NP problem L, there exists a polynomial time algorithm which can transform any instance of L into an instance of C with the same truth value. As a consequence, if we had a polynomial time algorithm for C, we could solve all co-NP problems in polynomial time.

The concept of co-NP-completeness is not particularly distinct from the concept of NP-completeness, since every NP problem is trivially convertible to a co-NP problem and vice-versa, by reversing "accept" and "reject". Consequently, every NP-complete problem can be converted to a co-NP complete problem.

This does not mean, however, that the concept of co-NP-completeness is useless, since it is possible that there exists a problem that is NP but not co-NP. Reversing the labels "accept" and "reject" results in a problem that is co-NP but not NP. It is an open problem whether NP=co-NP. Since the problem of P=NP is also open, all known instances of problems in $\mathsf{NP} \cap \mathsf{coNP}$ are stuck in P.

== Examples ==
One example of a co-NP-complete problem is checking tautology, the problem of determining whether a given Boolean formula is a tautology; that is, whether every possible assignment of true/false values to variables yields a true statement. This is complementary to the Boolean satisfiability problem, which asks whether there exists at least one such assignment, and is NP-complete. In more detail:

- Given a formula, if it is not a tautology, then it can be disproven in polynomial time by an explicit assignment.
- Given a formula, if it is satisfiable, then it can be proven in polynomial time by an explicit assignment.

If any sparse language is co-NP-complete (or even just co-NP-hard), then P = NP. This result is used in Mahaney's theorem.
