= Search problem =

Class of computational problems

In computational complexity theory and computability theory, a search problem is a computational problem of finding an admissible answer for a given input value, provided that such an answer exists. In fact, a search problem is specified by a binary relation R where xRy if and only if "y is an admissible answer given x". (Note: Luca Trevisan (2010), Stanford University - CS254: Computational Complexity, Handout 2 , p. 1.) Search problems frequently occur in graph theory and combinatorial optimization, e.g. searching for matchings, optional cliques, and stable sets in a given undirected graph.

An algorithm is said to solve a search problem if, for every input value x, it returns an admissible answer y for x when such an answer exists; otherwise, it returns any appropriate output, e.g. "not found" for x with no such answer.

== Definition ==
PlanetMath defines the problem as follows:

If $R$ is a binary relation such that $\operatorname{field}(R)\subseteq\Gamma^{+}$ and $T$ is a Turing machine, then $T$ calculates $f$ if: (Note: Henry, PlanetMath.org - search problem.)

- If $x$ is such that there is some $y$ such that $R(x,y)$ then $T$ accepts $x$ with output $z$ such that $R(x,z)$. (there may be multiple $y$, and $T$ need only find one of them)
- If $x$ is such that there is no $y$ such that $R(x,y)$ then $T$ rejects $x$.

Note that the graph of a partial function is a binary relation, and if $T$ calculates a partial function then there is at most one possible output.

An $R$ can be viewed as a search problem, and a Turing machine which calculates $R$ is also said to solve it. Every search problem has a corresponding decision problem, namely $L(R)=\{x\mid \exists y R(x,y)\}.$

This definition can be generalized to n-ary relations by any suitable encoding which allows multiple strings to be compressed into one string (for instance by listing them consecutively with a delimiter).

== See also ==
- Unbounded search operator
- Decision problem
- Optimization problem
- Counting problem (complexity)
- Function problem
- Search games
