= Parsimonious reduction =

Notion in computational complexity theory

In computational complexity theory and game complexity, a parsimonious reduction is a transformation from one problem to another (a reduction) that preserves the number of solutions. Informally, it is a bijection between the respective sets of solutions of two problems. A general reduction from problem $A$ to problem $B$ is a transformation that guarantees that whenever $A$ has a solution $B$ also has at least one solution and vice versa. A parsimonious reduction guarantees that for every solution of $A$, there exists a unique solution of $B$ and vice versa.

Parsimonious reductions are commonly used in computational complexity for proving the hardness of counting problems, for counting complexity classes such as #P. Additionally, they are used in game complexity, as a way to design hard puzzles that have a unique solution, as many types of puzzles require.

== Formal definition ==
A parsimonious reduction $R$ from problem $X$ to problem $Y$ is a reduction such that for each instance $x$ of $X$, the number of solutions to $x$ is equal to the number of solutions to the instance $R(x)$ of $Y$. If such a reduction exists, and if we have an oracle that counts the number of solutions to any given instance of $Y$, then we can design an algorithm that counts the number of solutions to any given instance of $X$. Consequently, if counting the number of solutions to the instances of $X$ is hard, then counting the number of solutions to $Y$ must be hard as well.

== Applications ==
Just as many-one reductions are important for proving NP-completeness, parsimonious reductions are important for proving completeness for counting complexity classes such as #P. Because parsimonious reductions preserve the property of having a unique solution, they are also used in game complexity, to show the hardness of puzzles such as sudoku where the uniqueness of the solution is an important part of the definition of the puzzle.

Specific types of parsimonious reductions may be defined by the computational complexity or other properties of the transformation algorithm. For instance, a polynomial-time parsimonious reduction is one in which the transformation algorithm takes polynomial time. These are the types of reduction used to prove #P-completeness. In parameterized complexity, FPT parsimonious reductions are used; these are parsimonious reductions whose transformation is a fixed-parameter tractable algorithm and that map bounded parameter values to bounded parameter values by a computable function.

Polynomial-time parsimonious reductions are a special case of a more general class of reductions for counting problems, the polynomial-time counting reductions.

One common technique used in proving that a reduction $R$ is parsimonious is to show that there is a bijection between the set of solutions to $x$ and the set of solutions to $R(x)$, which guarantees that the number of solutions to both problems is the same.

== Examples of parsimonious reduction in proving #P-completeness ==
The class #P contains the counting versions of NP decision problems. Given an instance $x$ of an NP decision problem $X,$ the problem $\#x$ asks for the number of solutions to problem $x.$ The examples of #P-completeness below rely on the fact that #SAT is #P-complete.

=== #3SAT ===
This is the counting version of 3SAT. One can show that any boolean formula can be rewritten as a formula in 3-CNF form. Any valid assignment of a boolean formula is a valid assignment of the corresponding 3-CNF formula, and vice versa. Hence, this reduction preserves the number of satisfying assignments, and is a parsimonious reduction. Then, #SAT and #3SAT are counting equivalents, and #3SAT is #P-complete as well.

=== Planar #3SAT ===
This is the counting version of Planar 3SAT. The hardness reduction from 3SAT to Planar 3SAT given by Lichtenstein has the additional property that for every valid assignment of an instance of 3SAT, there is a unique valid assignment of the corresponding instance of Planar 3SAT, and vice versa. Hence the reduction is parsimonious, and consequently Planar #3SAT is #P-complete.

=== Hamiltonian Cycle ===
The counting version of this problem asks for the number of Hamiltonian cycles in a given directed graph. Seta Takahiro provided a reduction from 3SAT to this problem when restricted to planar directed max degree-3 graphs. The reduction provides a bijection between the solutions to an instance of 3SAT and the solutions to an instance of Hamiltonian Cycle in planar directed max degree-3 graphs. Hence the reduction is parsimonious and Hamiltonian Cycle in planar directed max degree-3 graphs is #P-complete. Consequently, the general version of Hamiltonian Cycle problem must be #P-complete as well.

=== Shakashaka ===
Shakashaka provides an example of how parsimonious reduction could be used in showing hardness of logic puzzles. The decision version of this problem asks whether there is a solution to a given instance of the puzzle. The counting version asks for the number of distinct solutions to such a problem. The reduction from Planar 3SAT given by Demaine, Okamoto, Uehara and Uno also provides a bijection between the set of solutions to an instance of Planar 3SAT and the set of solutions to the corresponding instance of Shakashaka. Hence the reduction is parsimonious, and the counting version of Shakashaka is #P-complete.
