= Counting problem =

Counting problem may refer to:

- Enumeration
- Combinatorial enumeration
- Counting problem (complexity)
