= Georgy Egorychev =

Russian mathematician (1938–2023)

Professor Georgy Egorychev
- Георгий Петрович Егорычев
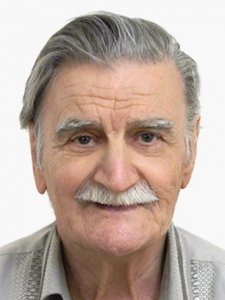
- Born: 6 May 1938; Sverdlovsk, Russia
- Died: 26 December 2023 (aged 85); Krasnoyarsk, Russia
- Education: Ural State University
- Known for: Van der Waerden's conjecture Egorychev method
- Awards: Fulkerson Prize (1982)
- Scientific career
- Workplaces: Siberian Federal University

Georgy Petrovich Egorychev (or Yegorychev; Russian: Георгий Петрович Егорычев, 6 May 1938 – 26 December 2023) was a Russian mathematician, known for the Egorychev method.

== Biography ==
He graduated in mathematics from Ural State University and in 1960 became a teacher of mathematics in secondary school.

In 1982 G. P. Egorychev and D. I. Falikman shared the Fulkerson Prize for (independently) proving Van der Waerden's conjecture that the matrix with all entries equal has the smallest permanent of any doubly stochastic matrix. Egorychev was a professor in the Department of Mathematical Support of Discrete Devices and Systems, Institute of Mathematics and Fundamental Informatics at Siberian Federal University (Russian abbreviation is SFU, SibFU, or СФУ), founded in 2006.

He was an Invited Speaker of the ICM in 1986 in Berkeley, California. He was awarded a Scholarship of the President of Russia in 1994–1996 and again in 1997–2000.

Egorychev died on 26 December 2023, in Krasnoyarsk, at the age of 85.

== Research ==
His research deals with combinatorial analysis, multidimensional complex analysis, and algorithms of integral representation and calculation of combinatorial sums and their applications in various fields of mathematics and science. In particular, his research has applied the Egorychev method to the basis of tensor calculus and to the theory of matrix functions, including permanents and determinants over various algebraic systems. He has published over 80 articles.

== Selected publications ==
- Егорычев Г.П. (2013). Новое семейство полиномиальных тождеств для вычисления детерминантов. Доклады Академии Наук, т. 452, No.1, с. 1–3. (A new family of polynomial identities for the calculation of determinants. Reports of the Academy of Sciences, vol. 452, No. 1, p. 1–3.)
- Egorychev G.P. (2009). Method of coefficients: an algebraic characterization and recent applications. Springer, Adv. in Combin. Math.; Math. Proc. of the Waterloo Workshop in Computer Algebra 2008, devoted to the 70th birthday of G. Egorychev, pp. 1–30.
- Egorychev G.P. and Zima E.V. (2008). Integral representation and Algorithms for closed form summation. Handbook of Algebra, vol. 5, ed. M. Hazewinkel, Elsevier, pp. 459–529.
- Егорычев Г.П. (2008). Дискретная математика. Перманенты. Учебное пособие. Красноярский государственный университет, Красноярск. 272 стр. (Discrete Math. Permanent. Tutorial. Krasnoyarsk State University, Krasnoyarsk. 272 pp.)
