= Seinosuke Toda =

Japanese computer scientist

Seinosuke Toda (戸田 誠之助, Toda Seinosuke; born January 15, 1959) is a computer scientist working at the Nihon University in Tokyo. Toda earned his Ph.D. from the Tokyo Institute of Technology in 1992, under the supervision of Kojiro Kobayashi. He was a recipient of the 1998 Gödel Prize for proving Toda's theorem in computational complexity theory, which states that every problem in the polynomial hierarchy has a polynomial-time Turing reduction to a counting problem.
