= Gamas's theorem =

Mathematical Theorem

Gamas's theorem is a result in multilinear algebra which states the necessary and sufficient conditions for a tensor symmetrized by an irreducible representation of the symmetric group $S_n$ to be zero. It was proven in 1988 by Carlos Gamas. Additional proofs have been given by Pate and Berget.

== Statement of the theorem ==
Let $V$ be a finite-dimensional complex vector space and $\lambda$ be a partition of $n$. From the representation theory of the symmetric group $S_n$ it is known that the partition $\lambda$ corresponds to an irreducible representation of $S_n$. Let $\chi^{\lambda}$ be the character of this representation. The tensor $v_1 \otimes v_2 \otimes \dots \otimes v_n \in V^{\otimes n}$ symmetrized by $\chi^{\lambda}$ is defined to be

$\frac{\chi^{\lambda}(e)}{n!} \sum_{\sigma \in S_n} \chi^{\lambda}(\sigma) v_{\sigma(1)} \otimes v_{\sigma(2)} \otimes \dots \otimes v_{\sigma(n)},$

where $e$ is the identity element of $S_n$. Gamas's theorem states that the above symmetrized tensor is non-zero if and only if it is possible to partition the set of vectors $\{v_i\}$ into linearly independent sets whose sizes are in bijection with the lengths of the columns of the partition $\lambda$.

== See also ==
- Algebraic combinatorics
- Immanant
- Schur polynomial
