= Ketan Mulmuley =

Professor of computer science

- Occupation: Academic
- Title: Professor of Computer Science

Academic background
- Education: Indian Institute of Technology, Bombay (B.Tech.); Carnegie Mellon University (PhD)
- Thesis: Full Abstraction and Semantic Equivalence (1985)
- Doctoral advisor: Dana Scott

Academic work
- Main interests: Geometric complexity theory P versus NP problem

Ketan Mulmuley is a professor in the Department of Computer Science at the University of Chicago, and a sometime visiting professor at IIT Bombay. He specializes in theoretical computer science, especially computational complexity theory, and in recent years has been working on "geometric complexity theory", an approach to the P versus NP problem through the techniques of algebraic geometry, with Milind Sohoni of IIT Bombay. He is also known for his result with Umesh Vazirani and Vijay Vazirani that showed that "Matching is as easy as matrix inversion", in a paper that introduced the isolation lemma.

== Education ==
Mulmuley earned his Bachelors of Technology in Electrical Engineering from IIT Bombay and earned his PhD in computer science from Carnegie Mellon University in 1985 under Dana Scott.

== Honors, awards and positions ==
Mulmuley's doctoral thesis Full Abstraction and Semantic Equivalence was awarded the 1986 ACM Doctoral Dissertation Award. He was awarded a Miller fellowship at the University of California, Berkeley for 1985–1987, was a fellow at the David and Lucile Packard Foundation in 1990, and was later awarded Guggenheim Foundation Fellowship for the year 1999–2000. He currently holds a professorship at the University of Chicago, where he is a part of the Theory Group.

== Books ==
- Jonah Blasiak; Ketan Mulmuley; Milind Sohoni (2015), Geometric Complexity Theory IV: Nonstandard Quantum Group for the Kronecker Problem, American Mathematical Society, ISBN 978-1-4704-2227-1
- Ketan Mulmuley (1985), Full abstraction and semantic equivalence, MIT Press, ISBN 978-0-262-13227-5
- Ketan Mulmuley (1994), Computational geometry: an introduction through randomized algorithms, Prentice-Hall, ISBN 978-0-13-336363-0
