= Low (complexity) =

In computational complexity theory, a language B (or a complexity class B) is said to be low for a complexity class A (with some reasonable relativized version of A) if A^{B} = A; that is, A with an oracle for B is equal to A. Such a statement implies that an abstract machine that solves problems in A achieves no additional power if it is given the ability to solve problems in B at unit cost. In particular, this means that if B is low for A then B is contained in A. Informally, lowness means that problems in B are not only solvable by machines that can solve problems in A, but are “easy to solve”. An A machine can simulate many oracle queries to B without exceeding its resource bounds.

Results and relationships that establish one class as low for another are often called lowness results. The set of languages low for a complexity class A is denoted Low(A).

== Classes that are low for themselves ==
Several natural complexity classes are known to be low for themselves, i.e. B^{B} = B. Such a class is sometimes called self-low. Scott Aaronson calls such a class a physical complexity class. Note that being self-low is a stronger condition than being closed under complement. Informally, a class being low for itself means a problem can use other problems in the class as unit-cost subroutines without exceeding the power of the complexity class.

The following classes are known to be self-low:

- P is self-low (that is, P^{P} = P) because polynomial functions are closed under composition, so a polynomial-time algorithm can make polynomially many queries to other polynomial-time algorithms, while retaining a polynomial overall running time.
- PSPACE (with restricted oracle access mechanism) is also self-low, and this can be established by exactly the same argument.
- L is self-low because it can simulate log-space oracle queries in log space, reusing the same space for each query.
- NC is also self-low for the same reason.
- ZPP is also low for itself and the same arguments almost work for BPP, but one has to account for errors, making it slightly harder to show that BPP is low for itself.
- Similarly, the argument for BPP almost goes through for BQP, but we have to additionally show that quantum queries can be performed in coherent superposition.
- Both Parity P (${\oplus}\hbox{P}$) and BPP are low for themselves. These were important in showing Toda's theorem.
- NP ∩ coNP is low for itself.

Every class that is low for itself is closed under complement, provided that it is powerful enough to negate a boolean query result. This implies that NP isn't low for itself unless NP = co-NP, which is considered unlikely because it implies that the polynomial hierarchy collapses to the first level, whereas it is widely believed that the hierarchy is infinite. The converse to this statement is not true. If a class is closed under complement, it does not mean that the class is low for itself. An example of such a class is EXPTIME, which is closed under complement, but is not low for itself.

== Classes that are low for other complexity classes ==
Some of the more complex and famous results regarding lowness of classes include:

- BQP is low for PP. In other words, a program based around taking the majority decision of an unbounded number of iterations of a poly-time randomized algorithm can easily solve all the problems that a quantum computer can solve efficiently.
- The graph isomorphism problem is low for parity P (${\oplus}\hbox{P}$). This means that if we can determine whether an NP machine has an even or odd number of accepting paths, we can easily solve graph isomorphism. In fact, it was later shown that graph isomorphism is low for ZPP^{NP}.
- Amplified PP is low for PP.
- NP ∩ coNP is equal to the set of languages low for NP, i.e., Low(NP) = NP ∩ coNP.
- AM ∩ coAM is low for ZPP^{NP}.

== Applications ==
Lowness is particularly valuable in relativization arguments, where it can be used to establish that the power of a class does not change in the "relativized universe" where a particular oracle machine is available for free. This allows us to reason about the class in the same manner we normally would. For example, in the relativized universe of BQP, PP is still closed under union and intersection. It's also useful when seeking to expand the power of a machine with oracles, because lowness results determine when the machine's power remains the same.

== See also ==
- Low (computability)
