= AWPP =

In theoretical computer science, almost wide probabilistic polynomial-time (AWPP) is a complexity class contained in PP defined via GapP functions. The class often arises in the context of quantum computing.

AWPP contains the complexity class BQP (bounded-error quantum polynomial time), which contains the decision problems solvable by a quantum computer in polynomial time, with an error probability of at most 1/3 for all instances. In fact, it is the smallest classical complexity class that upper bounds BQP. Furthermore, it is contained in the APP class.
