= Quantum Computing Since Democritus =

Book by Scott Aaronson

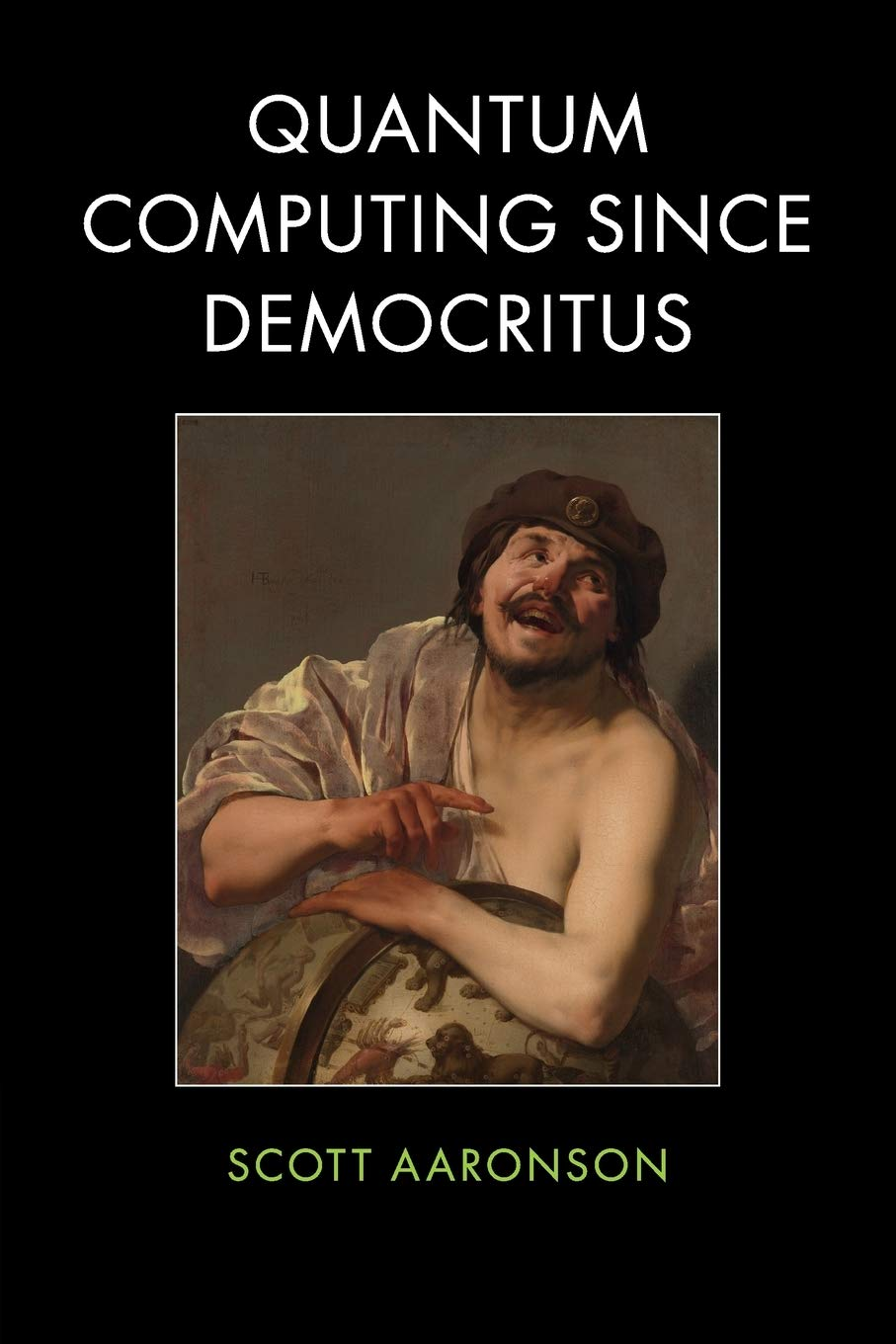
- Author: Scott Aaronson
- Publisher: Cambridge University Press
- Publication date: 2013
- Media type: print
- Pages: 398
- ISBN: 978-0521199568
- Website: Official website

Quantum Computing Since Democritus is a 2013 book on quantum information science written by Scott Aaronson. It is loosely based on a course Aaronson taught at the University of Waterloo, Canada, the lecture notes for which are available online.

== Contents ==
Aaronson has stated that he intends the book to be at the same level as Leonard Susskind's The Theoretical Minimum or Roger Penrose's The Road to Reality; Physics Today compared it to George Gamow's One Two Three... Infinity. The book covers everything from computer science to mathematics to quantum mechanics and quantum computing, starting, as the title indicates, with Democritus.

=== Front cover ===
The front cover image is an oil canvas painting of Democritus by Hendrik ter Brugghen dated 1628. It depicts Democritus as a young, laughing hedonist who points in the distance, as to where the folly of mankind is found.

The image invokes Aaronson's discussions on Democritus' concept of atoms and the void, which forms the foundational understanding of matter at the atomic level, is relevant to quantum computing, where manipulating and controlling individual quantum objects for calculations echoes the early atomic theory's significance.

== Author ==
Scott Aaronson is a professor of theoretical computer science at the University of Texas at Austin. He was previously a member of the faculty at MIT.

== Reception ==
In the Journal of the American Mathematical Society, Avi Wigderson considered it to have "much insight, wisdom, and fun", but conceded that it "is not for everyone". Widgerson noted in particular that the book would have been easier to read if it had provided more background material, and that it had little in the way of references to prior literature. Reviewing the book for Physics Today, Francis Sullivan deemed it "stimulating", while saying that it "covers too much territory to be used as a textbook" and taking exception with Aaronson's attitude "that mathematicians like complication because it makes things more interesting". Frederic Green's enthusiastic review for SIGACT News also judged the book poorly suited for a classroom text, except possibly in "a seminar-style course with a fairly open structure".

Reviel Netz gave the book a positive review in Common Knowledge, quipping that "I suspect that I was sent this book by mistake; despite its title, it has nothing to do with ancient science, my field."
