= Stathis Zachos =

Greek mathematician and logician (born 1947)

Stathis K. Zachos (Greek: Στάθης (Ευστάθιος) Ζάχος; born 1947 in Athens) is a mathematician, logician and theoretical computer scientist.

== Biography ==
Zachos received his PhD from the ETHZ (Swiss Federal Institute of Technology Zurich) in mathematics (and computer science), 1978. He has held the posts of professor in computer science at University of California, Santa Barbara, Brooklyn College at the City University of New York and National Technical University of Athens and adjunct professor at ETHZ. He has worked as a researcher at Massachusetts Institute of Technology, Brown-Boveri.

Stathis has published research papers in several areas of computer science. His work on randomized complexity classes, Arthur–Merlin protocols, and interactive proof systems has been very influential in proving important theorems and is cited in main textbooks of computational complexity. One of his important contributions, using interactive proof systems and probabilistic quantifiers, is that the graph isomorphism problem is not likely to be NP-complete (joint with R. Boppana, J. Hastad). Graph isomorphism is one of the very few celebrated problems in NP that have not been shown yet to be either NP-Complete or in P. Zachos's most influential work was introducing and proving properties of the class Parity-P (with Christos Papadimitriou). He also introduced probabilistic quantifiers and alternations of probabilistic quantifiers to uniformly describe various complexity classes as well as interactive proof systems and probabilistic games.

His current interests include probabilistic and functional complexity classes, combinatory algebras as a foundation to theory of computations, the interconnections of cryptographic techniques and computational complexity as well as algorithms for graph problems. He has co-organized International Conferences: STOC '87 (and programming committee of STOC '01), ICALP, CiE (Computability in Europe), PLS, ASL (Association for Symbolic Logic) European Summer Meeting, ACAC (Athens Colloquium on Algorithms and Complexity) and NYCAC (New York Colloquium on Algorithms and Complexity).

He is the brother of theoretical physicist Cosmas Zachos.

== See also ==
- List of Greek mathematicians
