= Dana Moshkovitz =

Israeli theoretical computer scientist

Dana Moshkovitz Aaronson
- דנה מושקוביץ
- Education: Weizmann Institute of Science
- Known for: Probabilistically Checkable Proofs
- Spouse: Scott Aaronson
- Awards: Haim Nessyahu Prize (2009)
- Scientific career
- Fields: Theoretical Computer Science
- Workplaces: University of Texas at Austin
- Doctoral advisor: Ran Raz

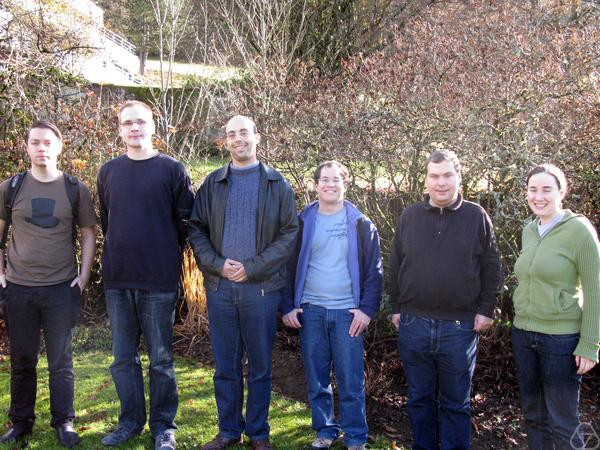
Dana Moshkovitz (rightmost) at the MFO Workshop Complexity Theory, Nov. 2009

Dana Moshkovitz Aaronson (Hebrew: דנה מושקוביץ) is an Israeli theoretical computer scientist whose research topics include probabilistically checkable proofs and pseudorandomness. She is a professor of computer science at the University of Texas at Austin.

== Education and career ==
Moshkovitz completed her Ph.D. in 2008 at the Weizmann Institute of Science. Her dissertation, Two Query Probabilistic Checking of Proofs with Subconstant Error, was supervised by Ran Raz, and won the 2009 Haim Nessyahu Prize of the Israel Mathematical Union for the best mathematics dissertation in Israel.

After postdoctoral research at Princeton University and the Institute for Advanced Study, Moshkovitz became a faculty member at the Massachusetts Institute of Technology. She moved to the University of Texas as an associate professor in 2016.

== Personal life ==
Moshkovitz is married to American theoretical computer scientist Scott Aaronson.
