= Ran Raz =

Israeli computer scientist

- רָן רָז
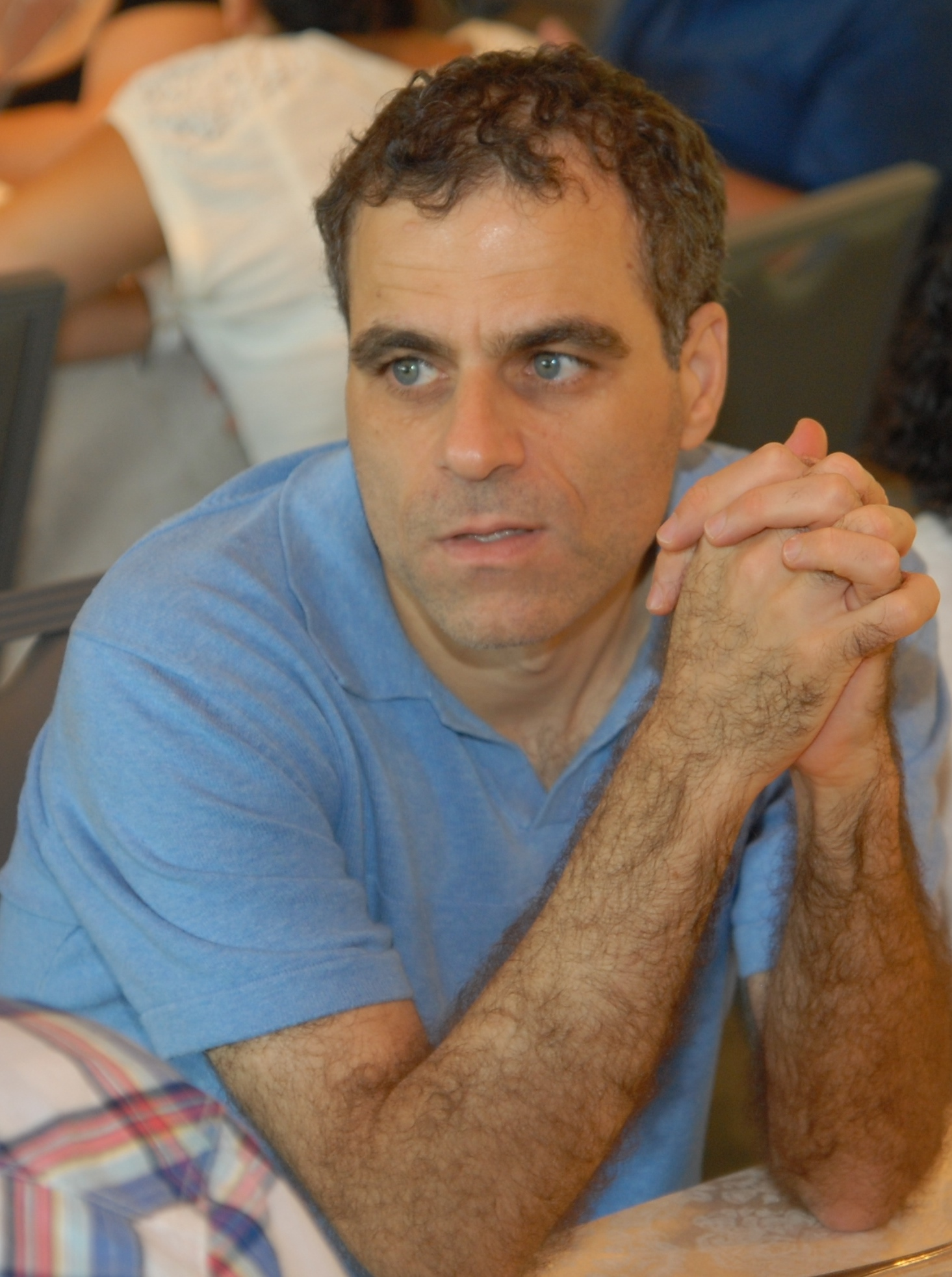
- Education: Hebrew University of Jerusalem
- Awards: Erdős Prize
- Scientific career
- Fields: Computer science; Computational complexity theory
- Workplaces: Princeton University; Weizmann Institute
- Thesis: Communication Complexity and Circuit Lower Bounds (1992)
- Doctoral advisor: Avi Wigderson; Michael Ben-Or
- Doctoral students: Dana Moshkovitz
- Website: www.wisdom.weizmann.ac.il/~ranraz/

Ran Raz (Hebrew: רָן רָז) is an Israeli computer scientist who works in the area of computational complexity theory. He was a professor in the Faculty of Mathematics and Computer Science at the Weizmann Institute before becoming a professor of computer science at Princeton University.

Raz received his Ph.D. at the Hebrew University of Jerusalem in 1992 under Avi Wigderson and Michael Ben-Or.

Raz is well known for his work on interactive proof systems. His two most-cited papers are Raz (1998) on multi-prover interactive proofs and Raz & Safra (1997) on probabilistically checkable proofs.

Raz received the Erdős Prize in 2002. In 2004, he received the Best Paper Award at ACM Symposium on Theory of Computing for Raz (2004), and the best paper award in IEEE Conference on Computational Complexity for Raz & Shpilka (2004). In 2008, the work Moshkovitz & Raz (2008) received the Best Paper Award at IEEE Symposium on Foundations of Computer Science (FOCS).

== Selected publications ==
- Raz, Ran; Safra, Shmuel (1997), "A sub-constant error-probability low-degree test, and a sub-constant error-probability PCP characterization of NP", Proc. STOC 1997, pp. 475–484, CiteSeerX 10.1.1.34.6957, doi:10.1145/258533.258641, ISBN 978-0-89791-888-6, S2CID 15457604.
- Raz, Ran (1998), "A parallel repetition theorem", SIAM Journal on Computing, 27 (3): 763–803, CiteSeerX 10.1.1.35.6859, doi:10.1137/S0097539795280895.
- Raz, Ran (2004), "Multi-linear formulas for permanent and determinant are of super-polynomial size", Proc. STOC 2004, pp. 633–641, CiteSeerX 10.1.1.2.9694, doi:10.1145/1007352.1007353, ISBN 978-1-58113-852-8, S2CID 1297877.
- Raz, Ran; Shpilka, Amir (2004), "Deterministic polynomial identity testing in non commutative models", Proc. CCC 2004, pp. 215–222, CiteSeerX 10.1.1.104.293, doi:10.1109/CCC.2004.1313845, ISBN 978-0-7695-2120-6.
- Moshkovitz, Dana; Raz, Ran (2008), "Two query PCP with sub-constant error", Proc. FOCS 2008, pp. 314–323, CiteSeerX 10.1.1.140.2111, doi:10.1109/FOCS.2008.60, ISBN 978-0-7695-3436-7.
