= Postselection =

Concept in probability theory

In probability theory, to postselect is to condition a probability space upon the occurrence of a given event. In symbols, once we postselect for an event $E$, the probability of some other event $F$ changes from $\operatorname{Pr}[F]$ to the conditional probability $\operatorname{Pr}[F\, |\, E]$.

For a discrete probability space, $\operatorname{Pr}[F\, |\, E] = \frac{\operatorname{Pr}[F \, \cap \, E]}{\operatorname{Pr}[E]}$, and thus we require that $\operatorname{Pr}[E]$ be strictly positive in order for the postselection to be well-defined.

See also PostBQP, a complexity class defined with postselection. Using postselection it seems quantum Turing machines are much more powerful: Scott Aaronson proved PostBQP is equal to PP.

Some quantum experiments use post-selection after the experiment as a replacement for communication during the experiment, by post-selecting the communicated value into a constant.
