= ZPP (complexity) =

Concept in computer science

ZPP in relation to other probabilistic complexity classes (RP, co-RP, BPP, BQP, PP), which generalise P within PSPACE. It is unknown if any of these containments are strict.

In complexity theory, ZPP (zero-error probabilistic polynomial time) is the complexity class of problems for which a probabilistic Turing machine exists with these properties:

- It always returns the correct YES or NO answer.
- The running time is polynomial in expectation for every input.

In other words, if the algorithm is allowed to flip a truly-random coin while it is running, it will always return the correct answer and, for a problem of size n, there is some polynomial p(n) such that the average running time will be less than p(n), even though it might occasionally be much longer. Such an algorithm is called a Las Vegas algorithm.

Alternatively, ZPP can be defined as the class of problems for which a probabilistic Turing machine exists with these properties:

- It always runs in polynomial time.
- It returns an answer YES, NO or DO NOT KNOW.
- The answer is always either DO NOT KNOW or the correct answer.
- It returns DO NOT KNOW with probability at most 1/2 for every input (and the correct answer otherwise).

The two definitions are equivalent.

The definition of ZPP is based on probabilistic Turing machines, but, for clarity, note that other complexity classes based on them include BPP and RP. The class BQP is based on another machine with randomness: the quantum computer.

== Intersection definition ==
The class ZPP is exactly equal to the intersection of the classes RP and co-RP. This is often taken to be the definition of ZPP. To show this, first note that every problem which is in both RP and co-RP has a Las Vegas algorithm as follows:

- Suppose we have a language L recognized by both the RP algorithm A and the (possibly completely different) co-RP algorithm B.
- Given an input, run A on the input for one step. If it returns YES, the answer must be YES. Otherwise, run B on the input for one step. If it returns NO, the answer must be NO. If neither occurs, repeat this step.

Note that only one machine can ever give a wrong answer, and the chance of that machine giving the wrong answer during each repetition is at most 50%. This means that the chance of reaching the kth round shrinks exponentially in k, showing that the expected running time is polynomial. This shows that RP intersect co-RP is contained in ZPP.

To show that ZPP is contained in RP intersect co-RP, suppose we have a Las Vegas algorithm C to solve a problem. We can then construct the following RP algorithm:

- Run C for at least double its expected running time. If it gives an answer, give that answer. If it doesn't give any answer before we stop it, give NO.

By Markov's inequality, the chance that it will yield an answer before we stop it is at least 1/2. This means the chance we'll give the wrong answer on a YES instance, by stopping and yielding NO, is at most 1/2, fitting the definition of an RP algorithm. The co-RP algorithm is identical, except that it gives YES if C "times out".

== Witness and proof ==
The classes NP, RP and ZPP can be thought of in terms of proof of membership in a set.

Definition: A verifier V for a set X is a Turing machine such that:

- if x is in X then there exists a string w such that V(x,w) accepts;
- if x is not in X, then for all strings w, V(x,w) rejects.

The string w can be thought of as the proof of membership. In the case of short proofs (of length bounded by a polynomial in the size of the input) which can be efficiently verified (V is a polynomial-time deterministic Turing machine), the string w is called a witness.

Notes:

- The definition is very asymmetric. The proof of x being in X is a single string. The proof of x not being in X is the collection of all strings, none of which is a proof of membership.
- For all x in X there must be a witness to its membership in X.
- The witness need not be a traditionally construed proof. If V is a probabilistic Turing machine which could possibly accept x if x is in X, then the proof is the string of coin flips which leads the machine to accept x (provided all members in X have some witness and the machine never accepts a non-member).
- The co-concept is a proof of non-membership, or membership in the complement set.

The classes NP, RP and ZPP are sets which have witnesses for membership. The class NP requires only that witnesses exist. They may be very rare. Of the 2^{f(|x|)} possible strings, with f a polynomial, only one need cause the verifier to accept (if x is in X. If x is not in X, no string will cause the verifier to accept).

For the classes RP and ZPP any string chosen at random will likely be a witness.

The corresponding co-classes have witness for non-membership. In particular, co-RP is the class of sets for which, if x is not in X, any randomly chosen string is likely to be a witness for non-membership. ZPP is the class of sets for which any random string is likely to be a witness of x in X, or x not in X, which ever the case may be.

Connecting this definition with other definitions of RP, co-RP and ZPP is easy. The probabilistic polynomial-time Turing Machine V*_{w}(x) corresponds to the deterministic polynomial-time Turing Machine V(x, w) by replacing the random tape of V* with a second input tape for V on which is written the sequence of coin flips. By selecting the witness as a random string, the verifier is a probabilistic polynomial-time Turing Machine whose probability of accepting x when x is in X is large (greater than 1/2, say), but zero if x ∉ X (for RP); of rejecting x when x is not in X is large but zero if x ∈ X (for co-RP); and of correctly accepting or rejecting x as a member of X is large, but zero of incorrectly accepting or rejecting x (for ZPP).

By repeated random selection of a possible witness, the large probability that a random string is a witness gives an expected polynomial time algorithm for accepting or rejecting an input. Conversely, if the Turing Machine is expected polynomial-time (for any given x), then a considerable fraction of the runs must be polynomial-time bounded, and the coin sequence used in such a run will be a witness.

ZPP should be contrasted with BPP. The class BPP does not require witnesses, although witnesses are sufficient (hence BPP contains RP, co-RP and ZPP). A BPP language has V(x,w) accept on a (clear) majority of strings w if x is in X, and conversely reject on a (clear) majority of strings w if x is not in X. No single string w need be definitive, and therefore they cannot in general be considered proofs or witnesses.

== Complexity-theoretic properties ==
ZPP is closed under complement, i.e., ZPP = co-ZPP (this follows from ZPP = RP ∩ co-RP).

ZPP is low for itself, meaning that a ZPP machine with the power to solve ZPP problems instantly (a ZPP oracle machine) is not any more powerful than the machine without this extra power. In symbols, ZPP^{ZPP} = ZPP.

ZPP^{NP^{BPP}} = ZPP^{NP}.

NP^{BPP} is contained in ZPP^{NP}.

== Connection to other classes ==
Since ZPP = RP ∩ coRP, ZPP is obviously contained in both RP and coRP.

The class P is contained in ZPP, and some computer scientists have conjectured that P = ZPP, i.e., every Las Vegas algorithm has a deterministic polynomial-time equivalent.

There exists an oracle relative to which ZPP = EXPTIME. A proof for ZPP = EXPTIME would imply that P ≠ ZPP, as P ≠ EXPTIME (see time hierarchy theorem).

== See also ==
- BPP
- RP
