= Scott Aaronson =

American computer scientist (born 1981)

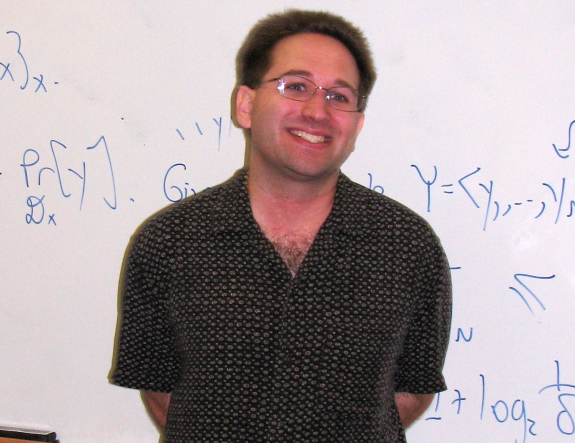
- Aaronson in 2011
- Born: Scott Joel Aaronson; May 21, 1981 (age 45); Philadelphia, Pennsylvania, United States
- Education: Cornell University; University of California, Berkeley
- Known for: Quantum Turing machine with postselection; Algebrization; Boson sampling
- Spouse: Dana Moshkovitz
- Awards: Alan T. Waterman Award; PECASE; Tomassoni–Chisesi Prize; ACM Prize in Computing
- Scientific career
- Fields: Computational complexity theory, quantum computing
- Workplaces: University of Texas at Austin; Massachusetts Institute of Technology; Institute for Advanced Study; University of Waterloo
- Doctoral advisor: Umesh Vazirani
- Website: scottaaronson.blog, www.scottaaronson.com

Scott Joel Aaronson (born May 21, 1981) is an American theoretical computer scientist and Schlumberger Centennial Chair of Computer Science at the University of Texas at Austin. His primary areas of research are computational complexity theory and quantum computing.

== Early life and education ==
Aaronson grew up in the United States, though he spent a year in Asia when his father was posted to Hong Kong. He enrolled in a school there that permitted him to skip ahead several years in math, but upon returning to the US, he had difficulties in school, getting bad grades and having run-ins with teachers. He enrolled in The Clarkson School, a gifted education program run by Clarkson University, which enabled Aaronson to apply for colleges while only in his freshman year of high school. He was accepted into Cornell University, where he obtained his BSc in computer science in 2000, and where he resided at the Telluride House. He then attended the University of California, Berkeley, for his PhD, which he got in 2004 under the supervision of Umesh Vazirani.

As a child, Aaronson was particularly interested in mathematics. In part due to this, he felt drawn to theoretical computing, particularly computational complexity theory. At Cornell, he became interested in quantum computing and devoted himself to computational complexity and quantum computing.

== Career ==
After postdoctorates at the Institute for Advanced Study and the University of Waterloo, he took a faculty position at MIT in 2007. His primary area of research is quantum computing and computational complexity theory more generally.

In the summer of 2016 he moved from MIT to the University of Texas at Austin as David J. Bruton Jr. Centennial Professor of Computer Sciences #2 and as the founding director of UT Austin's new Quantum Information Center. In summer 2022 he announced he would be working for a year at OpenAI on theoretical foundations of AI safety. He worked at the company for two years.

== Popular work ==
Aaronson is a founder of the Complexity Zoo wiki, which catalogs all classes of computational complexity. He is also the author of the blog "Shtetl-Optimized".

In a Scientific American interview he answers why his blog is called shtetl-optimized, and explains his preoccupation with the past:

Shtetls were Jewish villages in pre-Holocaust Eastern Europe. They're where all my ancestors came from—some actually from the same place (Vitebsk) as Marc Chagall, who painted the fiddler on the roof. I watched Fiddler many times as a kid, both the movie and the play. And every time, there was a jolt of recognition, like: "So that's the world I was designed to inhabit. All the aspects of my personality that mark me out as weird today, the obsessive reading and the literal-mindedness and even the rocking back and forth—I probably have them because back then they would've made me a better Talmud scholar, or something."

— Scott Aaronson

He also wrote the essay "Who Can Name The Bigger Number?". The latter work, widely distributed in academic computer science, uses the concept of Busy Beaver Numbers as described by Tibor Radó to illustrate the limits of computability in a pedagogic environment.

He has also taught a graduate-level survey course, "Quantum Computing Since Democritus", for which notes are available online, and have been published as a book by Cambridge University Press. It weaves together disparate topics into a cohesive whole, including quantum mechanics, complexity, free will, time travel, the anthropic principle and more. Many of these interdisciplinary applications of computational complexity were later fleshed out in his article, "Why Philosophers Should Care About Computational Complexity". Since then, Aaronson published a book entitled Quantum Computing Since Democritus based on the course.

Aaronson was a guest speaker at the 2007 Foundational Questions in Science Institute conference. In 2008, Aaronson's article "The Limits of Quantum Computers" was published in Scientific American.

Aaronson is frequently cited in the non-academic press, such as Science News, The Age, ZDNet, Slashdot, New Scientist, The New York Times, and Forbes magazine.

== Awards ==
- Aaronson is one of two winners of the 2012 Alan T. Waterman Award.
- Best Student Paper Awards at the Computational Complexity Conference for the papers "Limitations of Quantum Advice and One-Way Communication" (2004) and "Quantum Certificate Complexity" (2003).
- Danny Lewin Best Student Paper Award at the Symposium on Theory of Computing for the paper "Lower Bounds for Local Search by Quantum Arguments" (2004).
- 2009 Presidential Early Career Award for Scientists and Engineers
- 2009 Sloan Research Fellowship
- 2017 Simons Investigator
- He was elected as an ACM Fellow in 2019 "for contributions to quantum computing and computational complexity".
- He was awarded the 2020 ACM Prize in Computing "for groundbreaking contributions to quantum computing".
- He was elected to the US National Academy of Sciences in 2026.
- Inaugural 2026 Luca Trevisan Award for Expository Work from ACM SIGACT

== Personal life ==
Aaronson is married to computer scientist Dana Moshkovitz. Aaronson is Jewish, and has described himself as "radicalized in my Jewish and Zionist identities" after the International Olympiad on Informatics banned Israel from its competitions.

== See also ==
- Aaronson-Ambainis conjecture
