= Information paradox =

Information paradox is the short form for two paradoxes:

- Arrow information paradox in economics
- Black hole information paradox in physics
