= Interactive proof =

Interactive proof can refer to:

- The abstract concept of an Interactive proof system
- Interactive theorem proving software
