= Proof of knowledge =

Class of interactive proof

In cryptography, a proof of knowledge is an interactive proof in which the prover succeeds in 'convincing' a verifier that the prover knows something. What it means for an abstract machine to 'know something' is defined in terms of computation: a machine 'knows something' if this information can be computed given the machine itself as an input. Because the prover's program does not necessarily output the knowledge itself (as is the case for zero-knowledge proofs), a machine with a different program, called a knowledge extractor, is introduced to formalize this idea. This concept is mostly limited to what can be proven by polynomial time-bounded machines. In this case, the set of knowledge elements is limited to a set of witnesses of some language in NP.

Let $x$ be a statement in a language $L$ in NP, and $W(x)$ be the set of witnesses for $x$ that should be accepted in the proof. This allows us to define the following relation: $R = \{(x,w): x \in L, w \in W(x)\}$.

A proof of knowledge for relation $R$ with knowledge error $\kappa$ is a two-party protocol between a prover $P$ and a verifier $V$ with the following two properties:

1. Completeness: If $(x,w) \in R$, then the prover $P$ who knows witness $w$ for $x$ succeeds in convincing the verifier $V$ of its knowledge. More formally: $\Pr(P(x,w)\leftrightarrow V(x) \rightarrow 1) = 1$, i.e., given the interaction between the prover $P$ and the verifier $V$, the probability that the verifier is convinced is 1.
2. Validity: Validity requires that the success probability of a knowledge extractor $E$ in extracting the witness, given oracle access to a possibly malicious prover $\tilde P$, must be at least as high as the success probability of the prover $\tilde P$ in convincing the verifier. This property guarantees that no prover who lacks the witness can succeed in convincing the verifier.

== Details on the definition ==
This is a more rigorous definition of Validity:

Let $R$ be a witness relation, $W(x)$ be the set of all witnesses for public value $x$, and $\kappa$ be the knowledge error. A proof of knowledge is $\kappa$-valid if there exists a polynomial-time machine $E$, given oracle access to $\tilde P$, such that for every $\tilde P$, $E^{\tilde P(x)}(x) \in W(x) \cup \{ \bot \}$ and $\Pr(E^{\tilde P(x)}(x) \in W(x)) \geq \Pr(\tilde P(x)\leftrightarrow V(x) \rightarrow 1) - \kappa(x).$

The result $\bot$ signifies that the Turing machine $E$ did not reach a conclusion.

The knowledge error $\kappa(x)$ denotes the probability that the verifier $V$ accepts $x$, even though the prover does not actually know a witness $w$. The knowledge extractor $E$ is used to express what is meant by the knowledge of a Turing machine. If $E$ can extract $w$ from $\tilde P$, we say that $\tilde P$ knows the value of $w$.

This definition of the validity property combines the validity and strong validity properties. For small knowledge errors $\kappa(x)$, such as $2^{-80}$ or $1/\mathrm{poly}(|x|)$, it can be seen as stronger than the soundness of ordinary interactive proofs.

== Relation to general interactive proofs ==
In order to define a specific proof of knowledge, one must define not only the language, but also the witnesses the prover should know. In some cases proving membership in a language may be easy, while computing a specific witness may be hard. This is best explained using an example:

Let $\langle g \rangle$ be a cyclic group with generator $g$ in which solving the discrete logarithm problem is believed to be hard. Deciding membership in the language $L=\{x \mid g^w=x \}$ is trivial, as every $x \in \langle g \rangle$ belongs to it. However, finding the witness $w$ such that $g^w=x$ holds corresponds to solving the discrete logarithm problem.

== Protocols ==
=== Schnorr protocol ===
One of the simplest and most frequently used proofs of knowledge, the proof of knowledge of a discrete logarithm, is due to Schnorr. The protocol is defined over a cyclic group $G_q$ of order $q$ with generator $g$.

In order to prove knowledge of $x=\log_g y$, the prover interacts with the verifier as follows:

1. In the first round, the prover commits to randomness $r$; therefore, the first message $t=g^r$ is called the commitment.
2. The verifier replies with a challenge $c$ chosen at random.
3. After receiving $c$, the prover sends the third and final message (the response) $s=r+cx$ reduced modulo the order of the group ($q$).

The verifier accepts if $g^s = t y^{c}$.

We can see this is a valid proof of knowledge because it has an extractor that works as follows:

1. Simulate the prover to output $t=g^r$. The prover is now in state $Q$.
2. Generate a random value $c_1$ and input it to the prover, which outputs $s_1=r+c_1x$.
3. Rewind the prover to state $Q$. Now generate a different random value $c_2 \neq c_1$ and input it to the prover to obtain $s_2=r+c_2x$.
4. Output $(s_1-s_2)(c_1-c_2)^{-1} \bmod q$.

Since $(s_1-s_2)=(r+c_1x)-(r+c_2x)=x(c_1-c_2)$, the output of the extractor is precisely $x$.

This protocol happens to be zero-knowledge, though that property is not required for a proof of knowledge.

=== Sigma protocols ===
Protocols that follow the three-move structure above (commitment, challenge, and response) are called sigma protocols. The name originates from Sig, referring to the zig-zag symbolizing the three moves of the protocol, and MA, an abbreviation of "Merlin-Arthur". Sigma protocols exist for proving various statements, such as those pertaining to discrete logarithms. Using these proofs, the prover can not only prove knowledge of the discrete logarithm, but also that the discrete logarithm has a specific form. For instance, it is possible to prove that two logarithms of $y_1$ and $y_2$ with respect to bases $g_1$ and $g_2$ are equal or fulfill some other linear relation. For elements $a$ and $b$ of $\mathbb{Z}_q$, we say that the prover proves knowledge of $x_1$ and $x_2$ such that $y_1= g_1^{x_1} \land y_2=g_2^{x_2}$ and $x_2 = a x_1 + b$. Equality corresponds to the special case where $a = 1$ and $b = 0$. As $x_2$ can be trivially computed from $x_1$, this is equivalent to proving knowledge of an $x$ such that $y_1= g_1^{x} \land y_2={(g_2^a)}^{x} g_2^b$.

This is the intuition behind the following notation, which is commonly used to express what is being proven by a proof of knowledge:

$$PK\{(x): y_1= g_1^{x} \land y_2={(g_2^a)}^{x} g_2^b \},$$

which states that the prover knows an $x$ that fulfills the relation above.

== Applications ==
Proofs of knowledge are a useful tool for constructing identification protocols and, in their non-interactive variant, signature schemes such as the Schnorr signature.

They are also used in the construction of group signature and anonymous digital credential systems.

== See also ==
- Cryptographic protocol
- Interactive proof system
- Soundness (interactive proof)
- Topics in cryptography
- Zero-knowledge password proof
- Zero-knowledge proof
