= John Watrous (computer scientist) =

Theoretical computer scientist

John Harrison Watrous
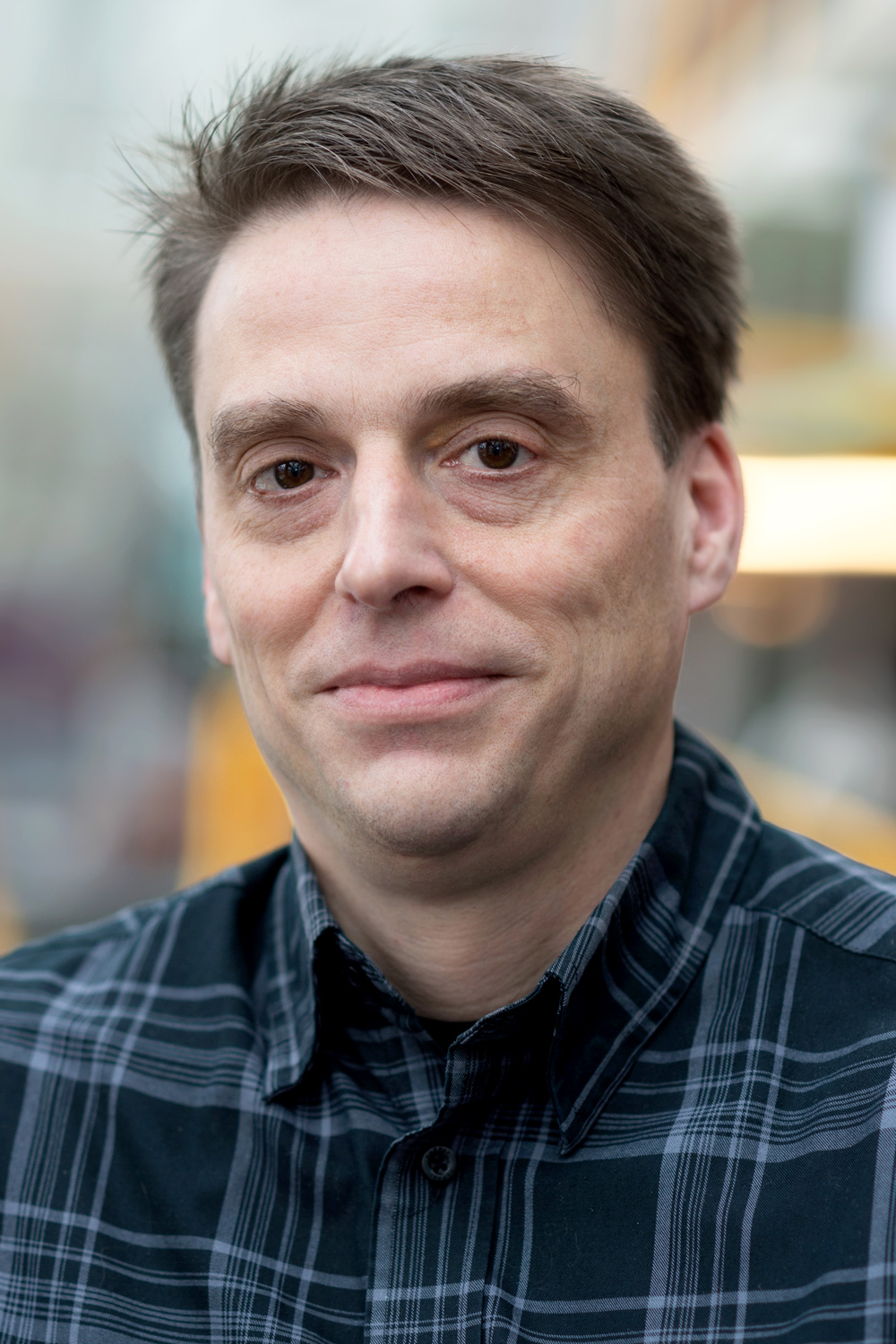
- Education: University of Wisconsin–Madison; Stony Brook University
- Scientific career
- Fields: Computer Science, Quantum Computing
- Workplaces: IBM; University of Calgary; University of Waterloo; Institute for Quantum Computing; Perimeter Institute for Theoretical Physics
- Doctoral advisor: Eric Bach
- Website: https://jhwatrous.github.io/

John Harrison Watrous is an American computer scientist who served as the Technical Director of IBM Quantum Education at IBM and was a professor of computer science at the David R. Cheriton School of Computer Science at the University of Waterloo, a member of the Institute for Quantum Computing, an affiliate member of the Perimeter Institute for Theoretical Physics and a Fellow of the Canadian Institute for Advanced Research. He was a faculty member in the Department of Computer Science at the University of Calgary from 2002 to 2006 where he held a Canada Research Chair in quantum computing.

He is an editor of the journal Theory of Computing and former editor for the journal Quantum Information & Computation. His research interests include quantum information and quantum computation. He is well known for his work on quantum interactive proofs, and the quantum analogue of the celebrated result IP = PSPACE: QIP = PSPACE. This was preceded by a series of results, showing QIP can be constrained to 3 messages, QIP is contained in EXP, and the 2-message version of QIP is in PSPACE. He has also published important papers on quantum finite automata and quantum cellular automata. With Scott Aaronson, he showed that certain forms of time travel can make quantum and classical computation equivalent: together, the authors showed that quantum effects do not offer advantages for computation if computers can send information to the past through a type of closed timelike curve proposed by the physicist David Deutsch.

He obtained his Ph.D. in 1998 at the University of Wisconsin–Madison under the supervision of Eric Bach.
