= IP (complexity) =

Complexity class from interactive proofs

In computational complexity theory, the class IP (which stands for interactive proof) is the class of problems solvable by an interactive proof system. It is equal to the class PSPACE. The result was established in a series of papers: the first by Lund, Karloff, Fortnow, and Nisan showed that co-NP had multiple-prover interactive proofs; and the second, by Shamir, employed their technique to establish that IP=PSPACE. The result is a famous example where the proof does not relativize.

The concept of an interactive proof system was first introduced by Shafi Goldwasser, Silvio Micali, and Charles Rackoff in 1985. An interactive proof system consists of two machines, a prover, P, which presents a proof that a given string n is a member of some language, and a verifier, V, that checks that the presented proof is correct. The prover is assumed to be infinite in computation and storage, while the verifier is a probabilistic polynomial-time machine with access to a random bit string whose length is polynomial on the size of n. These two machines exchange a polynomial number, p(n), of messages and once the interaction is completed, the verifier must decide whether or not n is in the language, with only a 1/3 chance of error. (So any language in BPP is in IP, since then the verifier could simply ignore the prover and make the decision on its own.)

General representation of an interactive proof protocol.

== Definition ==
A language L belongs to IP if there exist V, P such that for all Q, w:

$$w \in L \Rightarrow \Pr[V \leftrightarrow P\text{ accepts }w] \ge \tfrac{2}{3}$$
$$w \not \in L \Rightarrow \Pr[V \leftrightarrow Q\text{ accepts }w] \le \tfrac{1}{3}$$

The Arthur–Merlin protocol, introduced by László Babai, is similar in nature, except that the number of rounds of interaction is bounded by a constant rather than a polynomial.

Goldwasser et al. have shown that public-coin protocols, where the random numbers used by the verifier are provided to the prover along with the challenges, are no less powerful than private-coin protocols. At most two additional rounds of interaction are required to replicate the effect of a private-coin protocol. The opposite inclusion is straightforward, because the verifier can always send to the prover the results of their private coin tosses, which proves that the two types of protocols are equivalent.

In the following section we prove that IP = PSPACE, an important theorem in computational complexity, which demonstrates that an interactive proof system can be used to decide whether a string is a member of a language in polynomial time, even though the traditional PSPACE proof may be exponentially long.

== Proof of IP = PSPACE ==
The proof can be divided in two parts, we show that IP ⊆ PSPACE and PSPACE ⊆ IP.

=== IP ⊆ PSPACE ===
In order to demonstrate that IP ⊆ PSPACE, we present a simulation of an interactive proof system by a polynomial space machine. Now, we can define:

$$\Pr[V\text{ accepts }w\text{ starting at }M_j] = \max\nolimits_P \Pr \left [V \leftrightarrow P\text{ accepts }w\text{ starting at }M_j \right ]$$

and for every 0 ≤ j ≤ p and every message history M_{j}, we inductively define the function N_{M_{j}}:

$$N_{M_j} =  \begin{cases}
0 & j = p\text{ and }m_p = \text{reject}\\
1 & j = p\text{ and }m_p = \text{accept}\\
\max_{m_{j+1}} N_{M_{j+1}} & j < p\text{ and }j\text{ is odd} \\
\text{wt-avg}_{m_{j+1}} N_{M_{j+1}} & j < p\text{ and }j\text{ is even} \\
\end{cases}$$

where:

$$\text{wt-avg}_{m_{j+1}} N_{M_{j+1}} := \sum\nolimits_{m_{j+1}} \Pr\nolimits_r[V(w,r,M_j)=m_{j+1}]N_{M_{j+1}}$$

where Pr_{r} is the probability taken over the random string r of length p. This expression is the average of N_{M_{j+1}}, weighted by the probability that the verifier sent message m_{j+1}.

Take M_{0} to be the empty message sequence, here we will show that N_{M_{0}} can be computed in polynomial space, and that N_{M_{0}} = Pr[V accepts w]. First, to compute N_{M_{0}}, an algorithm can recursively calculate the values N_{M_{j}} for every j and M_{j}. Since the depth of the recursion is p, only polynomial space is necessary. The second requirement is that we need N_{M_{0}} = Pr[V accepts w], the value needed to determine whether w is in A. We use induction to prove this as follows.

We must show that for every 0 ≤ j ≤ p and every M_{j}, N_{M_{j}} = Pr[V accepts w starting at M_{j}], and we will do this using induction on j. The base case is to prove for j = p. Then we will use induction to go from p down to 0.

The base case of j = p is fairly simple. Since m_{p} is either accept or reject, if m_{p} is accept, N_{M_{p}} is defined to be 1 and Pr[V accepts w starting at M_{j}] = 1 since the message stream indicates acceptance, thus the claim is true. If m_{p} is reject, the argument is very similar.

For the inductive step, we assume that for some j+1 ≤ p and any message sequence M_{j+1}, N_{M_{j+1}} = Pr[V accepts w starting at M_{j+1}] and then prove the hypothesis for j and any message sequence M_{j}.

If j is even, m_{j+1} is a message from V to P. By the definition of N_{M_{j}},

$$N_{M_j} = \sum\nolimits_{m_{j+1}} \Pr\nolimits_r \left [V(w,r,M_j)=m_{j+1} \right ] N_{M_{j+1}}.$$

Then, by the inductive hypothesis, we can say this is equal to

$$\sum\nolimits_{m_{j+1}} \Pr\nolimits_r \left [V(w,r,M_j)=m_{j+1} \right ] * \Pr \left [V\text{ accepts }w\text{ starting at }M_{j+1} \right ].$$

Finally, by definition, we can see that this is equal to Pr[V accepts w starting at M_{j}].

If j is odd, m_{j+1} is a message from P to V. By definition,

$$N_{M_j} = \max\nolimits_{m_{j+1}} N_{M_{j+1}}.$$

Then, by the inductive hypothesis, this equals

$$\max\nolimits_{m_{j+1}} * \Pr[V\text{ accepts }w\text{ starting at }M_{j+1}].$$

This is equal to Pr[V accepts w starting at M_{j}] since:

$$\max\nolimits_{m_{j+1}} \Pr[V\text{ accepts }w\text{ starting at }M_{j+1}] \leq \Pr[V\text{ accepts w starting at }M_j]$$

because the prover on the right-hand side could send the message m_{j+1} to maximize the expression on the left-hand side. And:

$$\max\nolimits_{m_{j+1}} \Pr\left[V\text{ accepts }w\text{ starting at }M_{j+1} \right] \geq \Pr\left[V\text{ accepts }w\text{ starting at }M_j\right]$$

Since the same Prover cannot do any better than send that same message. Thus, this holds whether i is even or odd and the proof that IP ⊆ PSPACE is complete.

Here we have constructed a polynomial space machine that uses the best prover P for a particular string w in language A. We use this best prover in place of a prover with random input bits because we are able to try every set of random input bits in polynomial space. Since we have simulated an interactive proof system with a polynomial space machine, we have shown that IP ⊆ PSPACE, as desired.

=== PSPACE ⊆ IP ===
In order to illustrate the technique that will be used to prove PSPACE ⊆ IP, we will first prove a weaker theorem, which was proven by Lund, et al.: #SAT ∈ IP. Then using the concepts from this proof we will extend it to show that TQBF ∈ IP. Since TQBF ∈ PSPACE-complete, and TQBF ∈ IP then PSPACE ⊆ IP.

==== #SAT is a member of IP ====
We begin by showing that #SAT is in IP, where:

$$\#\text{SAT} = \left \{ \langle \varphi, k \rangle \ : \  \varphi \text{ is a CNF-formula with exactly } k \text{ satisfying assignments} \right \}.$$

Note that this is different from the normal definition of #SAT, in that it is a decision problem, rather than a function.

First we use arithmetization to map the Boolean formula with n variables, φ(b_{1}, ..., b_{n}) to a polynomial p_{φ}(x_{1}, ..., x_{n}), where p_{φ} mimics φ in that p_{φ} is 1 if φ is true and 0 otherwise provided that the variables of p_{φ} are assigned Boolean values. The Boolean operations ∨, ∧ and ¬ used in φ are simulated in p_{φ} by replacing the operators in φ as shown in the table below.

Arithmetization rules for converting a Boolean formula φ(b_{1}, ..., b_{n}) to a polynomial p_{φ}(x_{1}, ..., x_{n})
a ∧ b	ab
a ∨ b	a ∗ b := 1 − (1 − a)(1 − b)
¬a	1 − a

As an example, $\phi = a \and (b \or \neg c)$ would be converted into a polynomial as follows:

$$\begin{align}
p_\varphi &= a \wedge (b \vee \neg c) \\
&= a \wedge \left (b * (1-c) \right ) \\
&= a \wedge \left ( 1 - (1-b)(1 - (1-c)) \right ) \\
&= a \left ( 1 - (1-b)(1 - (1-c)) \right ) \\
&= a - (ac-abc)
\end{align}$$

The operations ab and a ∗ b each result in a polynomial with a degree bounded by the sum of the degrees of the polynomials for a and b and hence, the degree of any variable is at most the length of φ.

Now let F be a finite field with order q > 2^{n}; also demand that q be at least 1000. For each 0 ≤ i ≤ n, define a function f_{i} on F, having parameters $a_1, \dots, a_{i-1}\in F$, and a single variable $a_i \in F$: For 0 ≤ i ≤ n and for $a_1, \dots, a_i \in F$ let

$$f_i(a_1, \dots, a_i) = \sum\nolimits_{a_{i+1}, \dots, a_n \in \{0, 1\}} p(a_1, \dots, a_n).$$

Note that the value of f_{0} is the number of satisfying assignments of φ. f_{0} is a void function, with no variables.

Now the protocol for #SAT works as follows:

- Phase 0: The prover P chooses a prime q > 2^{n} and computes f_{0}, it then sends q and f_{0} to the verifier V. V checks that q is a prime greater than max(1000, 2^{n}) and that f_{0}() = k.
- Phase 1: P sends the coefficients of f_{1}(z) as a polynomial in z. V verifies that the degree of f_{1} is less than n and that f_{0} = f_{1}(0) + f_{1}(1). (If not V rejects). V now sends a random number r_{1} from F to P.
- Phase i: P sends the coefficients of $f_i(r_1, \dots, r_{i-1}, z)$ as a polynomial in z. V verifies that the degree of f_{i} is less than n and that $f_{i-1}(r_1, \dots, r_{i-1}) = f_i(r_1, \dots, r_{i-1}, 0) + f_i(r_1, \dots, r_{i-1}, 1)$. (If not V rejects). V now sends a random number r_{i} from F to P.
- Phase n+1: V evaluates $p(r_1, \dots, r_n)$ to compare to the value $f_n(r_1, \dots, r_n)$. If they are equal V accepts, otherwise V rejects.

Note that this is a public-coin algorithm.

If φ has k satisfying assignments, clearly V will accept. If φ does not have k satisfying assignments we assume there is a prover $\tilde P$ that tries to convince V that φ does have k satisfying assignments. We show that this can only be done with low probability.

To prevent V from rejecting in phase 0, $\tilde P$ has to send an incorrect value $\tilde f_0()$ to P. Then, in phase 1, $\tilde P$ must send an incorrect polynomial $\tilde f_1$ with the property that $\tilde f_1(0)+\tilde f_1(1) = \tilde f_0()$. When V chooses a random r_{1} to send to P,

$$\Pr \left [\tilde f_1(r_1) = f_1(r_1) \right ] < \tfrac{1}{n^2}.$$

This is because a polynomial in a single variable of degree at most d can have no more than d roots (unless it always evaluates to 0). So, any two polynomials in a single variable of degree at most d can be equal only in d places. Since |F| > 2^{n} the chances of r_{1} being one of these values is at most $n/2^n < n/n^3$ if n > 10, or at most (n/1000) ≤ (n/n^{3}) if n ≤ 10.

Generalizing this idea for the other phases we have for each 1 ≤ i ≤ n if

$$\tilde f_{i-1}(r_1, \dots, r_{i-1}) \neq f_{i-1}(r_1, \dots, r_{i-1}),$$

then for r_{i} chosen randomly from F,

$$\Pr \left [\tilde f(r_1, \dots, r_i) = f_i(r_1, \dots, r_i) \right ] \leq \tfrac{1}{n^2}.$$

There are n phases, so the probability that $\tilde P$ is lucky because V selects at some stage a convenient r_{i} is at most 1/n. So, no prover can make the verifier accept with probability greater than 1/n. We can also see from the definition that the verifier V operates in probabilistic polynomial time. Thus, #SAT ∈ IP.

==== TQBF is a member of IP ====
In order to show that PSPACE is a subset of IP, we need to choose a PSPACE-complete problem and show that it is in IP. Once we show this, then it clear that PSPACE ⊆ IP. The proof technique demonstrated here is credited to Adi Shamir.

We know that TQBF is in PSPACE-Complete. So let ψ be a quantified Boolean expression:

$$\psi = \mathsf Q_1 x_1 \dots \mathsf Q_mx_m[\varphi]$$

where φ is a CNF formula. Then Q_{i} is a quantifier, either ∃ or ∀. Now f_{i} is the same as in the previous proof, but now it also includes quantifiers.

$$f_i(a_1, \dots, a_i) =  \begin{cases}
f_i(a_1, \dots, a_m) =  1 & \mathsf Q_{i+1}x_{i+1}\dots \mathsf Q_mx_m[\varphi(a_1, \dots, a_i)] \text{ is true}\\
0 & \text{otherwise}
\end{cases}$$

Here, φ(a_{1}, ..., a_{i}) is φ with a_{1} to a_{i} substituted for x_{1} to x_{i}. Thus f_{0} is the truth value of ψ. In order to arithmetize ψ we must use the following rules:

$$f_i(a_1, \dots,a_i) = \begin{cases} f_{i+1}(a_1, \dots,a_i,0)\cdot f_{i+1}(a_1, \dots,a_i,1) & \mathsf Q_{i+1} = \forall \\
f_{i+1}(a_1, \dots,a_i,0) * f_{i+1}(a_1, \dots,a_i,1) & \mathsf Q_{i+1} = \exists
\end{cases}$$

where as before we define x ∗ y = 1 − (1 − x)(1 − y).

By using the method described in #SAT, we must face a problem that for any f_{i} the degree of the resulting polynomial may double with each quantifier. In order to prevent this, we must introduce a new reduction operator R which will reduce the degrees of the polynomial without changing their behavior on Boolean inputs.

So now before we arithmetize $\psi = \mathsf Q_1x_1\dots \mathsf Q_mx_m[\varphi]$ we introduce a new expression:

$$\psi' = \mathsf Q_1 \mathrm R x_1 \mathsf Q_2 \mathrm R x_1 \mathrm R x_2\dots \mathsf Q_m \mathrm R x_1 \dots \mathrm R x_m [\varphi]$$

or put another way:

$$\psi' = \mathsf S_1 y_1\dots \mathsf S_k y_k[\varphi], \qquad \text{ where }\mathsf S_i \in \{ \forall ,\exists , \mathrm R\}, \ y_i \in \{ x_1,\dots,x_m\}$$

Now for every i ≤ k we define the function f_{i}. We also define $f_k(x_1,\dots,x_m)$ to be the polynomial p(x_{1}, ..., x_{m}) which is obtained by arithmetizing φ. Now in order to keep the degree of the polynomial low, we define f_{i} in terms of f_{i+1}:

$$\text{If }\mathsf S_{i+1} = \forall, \quad f_i(a_1,\dots,a_i) = f_{i+1}(a_1,\dots,a_i,0) \cdot f_{i+1}(a_1,\dots,a_i,1)$$
$$\text{If }\mathsf S_{i+1} = \exists, \quad f_i(a_1,\dots,a_i) = f_{i+1}(a_1,\dots,a_i,0) * f_{i+1}(a_1,\dots,a_i,1)$$
$$\text{If }\mathsf S_{i+1} = \mathrm R, \quad f_i(a_1,\dots,a_i,a) =  (1-a)f_{i+1}(a_1,\dots,a_i,0) + a f_{i+1}(a_1,\dots,a_i,1)$$

Now we can see that the reduction operation R, doesn't change the degree of the polynomial. Also it is important to see that the R_{x} operation doesn't change the value of the function on Boolean inputs. So f_{0} is still the truth value of ψ, but the R_{x} value produces a result that is linear in x. Also after any $\mathsf Q_i x_i$ we add $\mathrm R_{x_1}\dots \mathrm R_{x_i}$ in ψ′ in order to reduce the degree down to 1 after arithmetizing $\mathsf Q_i$.

Now let's describe the protocol. If n is the length of ψ, all arithmetic operations in the protocol are over a field of size at least n^{4} where n is the length of ψ.

- Phase 0: P → V: P sends f_{0} to V. V checks that f_{0}= 1 and rejects if not.
- Phase 1: P → V: P sends f_{1}(z) to V. V uses coefficients to evaluate f_{1}(0) and f_{1}(1). Then it checks that the polynomial's degree is at most n and that the following identities are true:

$$f_{0}(\varnothing) = \begin{cases}
f_{1}(0)\cdot f_{1}(1) & \text{ if }\mathsf S = \forall \\
f_{1}(0) * f_{1}(1) & \text{ if }\mathsf S = \exists. \\
(1-r)f_{1}(0) + rf_{1}(1) & \text{ if }\mathsf S = \mathrm R.
\end{cases}$$

If either fails then reject.

- Phase i: P → V: P sends $f_i(r_1,\dots,r_{i-1},z)$ as a polynomial in z. r_{1} denotes the previously set random values for $r_1,\dots,r_{i-1}$

V uses coefficients to evaluate $f_i(r_1,\dots,r_{i-1},0)$ and $f_i(r_1,\dots,r_{i-1},1)$. Then it checks that the polynomial degree is at most n and that the following identities are true:

$$f_{i-1}(r_1,\dots,r_{i-1}) = \begin{cases} f_{i}(r_1,\dots,r_{i-1},0)\cdot f_{i}(r_1,\dots, r_{i-1},1) & \mathsf S = \forall \\
f_{i}(r_1,\dots,r_{i-1},0) * f_i(r_1, \dots,r_{i-1},1) & \mathsf S = \exists.
\end{cases}$$
$$f_{i-1}(r_1\dots r) = (1-r)f_{i}(r_1,\dots,r_{i-1},0) + rf_{i}(r_1,\dots,r_{i-1},1)\text{ if }\mathsf S = \mathrm R.$$

If either fails then reject.

V → P: V picks a random r in F and sends it to P. (If $\mathsf S=\mathrm R$ then this r replaces the previous r).

Goto phase i + 1 where P must persuade V that $f_i(r_1,\dots,r)$ is correct.

- Phase k + 1: V evaluates $p(r_1,\dots,r_m)$. Then it checks if $p(r_1,\dots,r_m) = f_k(r_1,\dots,r_m)$ If they are equal then V accepts, otherwise V rejects.

This is the end of the protocol description.

If ψ is true then V will accept when P follows the protocol. Likewise if $\tilde{P}$ is a malicious prover which lies, and if ψ is false, then $\tilde{P}$ will need to lie at phase 0 and send some value for f_{0}. If at phase i, V has an incorrect value for $f_{i-1}(r_1,\dots)$ then $f_i(r_1,\dots,0)$ and $f_i(r_1,\dots,1)$ will likely also be incorrect, and so forth. The probability for $\tilde{P}$ to get lucky on some random r is at most the degree of the polynomial divided by the field size: $n/n^4$. The protocol runs through O(n^{2}) phases, so the probability that $\tilde{P}$ gets lucky at some phase is ≤ 1/n. If $\tilde{P}$ is never lucky, then V will reject at phase k+1.

Since we have now shown that both IP ⊆ PSPACE and PSPACE ⊆ IP, we can conclude that IP = PSPACE as desired. Moreover, we have shown that any IP algorithm may be taken to be public-coin, since the reduction from PSPACE to IP has this property.

== Variants ==
There are a number of variants of IP which slightly modify the definition of the interactive proof system. We summarize some of the better-known ones here.

=== dIP ===
A subset of IP is the deterministic Interactive Proof class, which is similar to IP but has a deterministic verifier (i.e. with no randomness). This class is equal to NP.

=== Perfect completeness ===
An equivalent definition of IP replaces the condition that the interaction succeeds with high probability on strings in the language with the requirement that it always succeeds:

$$w \in L \Rightarrow \Pr[V \leftrightarrow P\text{ accepts }w] = 1$$

This seemingly stronger criterion of "perfect completeness" does not change the complexity class IP, since any language with an interactive proof system may be given an interactive proof system with perfect completeness.

=== MIP ===
In 1988, Goldwasser et al. created an even more powerful interactive proof system based on IP called MIP in which there are two independent provers. The two provers cannot communicate once the verifier has begun sending messages to them. Just as it's easier to tell if a criminal is lying if he and his partner are interrogated in separate rooms, it's considerably easier to detect a malicious prover trying to trick the verifier if there is another prover it can double-check with. In fact, this is so helpful that Babai, Fortnow, and Lund were able to show that MIP = NEXPTIME, the class of all problems solvable by a nondeterministic machine in exponential time, a very large class. Moreover, all languages in NP have zero-knowledge proofs in an MIP system, without any additional assumptions; this is only known for IP assuming the existence of one-way functions.

=== IPP ===
IPP (unbounded IP) is a variant of IP where we replace the BPP verifier by a PP verifier. More precisely, we modify the completeness and soundness conditions as follows:

- Completeness: if a string is in the language, the honest verifier will be convinced of this fact by an honest prover with probability at least 1/2.
- Soundness: if the string is not in the language, no prover can convince the honest verifier that it is in the language, except with probability less than 1/2.

Although IPP also equals PSPACE, IPP protocols behaves quite differently from IP with respect to oracles: IPP=PSPACE with respect to all oracles, while IP ≠ PSPACE with respect to almost all oracles.

=== QIP ===
QIP is a version of IP replacing the BPP verifier by a BQP verifier, where BQP is the class of problems solvable by quantum computers in polynomial time. The messages are composed of qubits. In 2009, Jain, Ji, Upadhyay, and Watrous proved that QIP also equals PSPACE, implying that this change gives no additional power to the protocol. This subsumes a previous result of Kitaev and Watrous that QIP is contained in EXPTIME because QIP = QIP[3], so that more than three rounds are never necessary.

=== compIP ===
Whereas IPP and QIP give more power to the verifier, a compIP system (competitive IP proof system) weakens the completeness condition in a way that weakens the prover:

- Completeness: if a string is in the language L, the honest verifier will be convinced of this fact by an honest prover with probability at least 2/3. Moreover, the prover will do so in probabilistic polynomial time given access to an oracle for the language L.

Essentially, this makes the prover a BPP machine with access to an oracle for the language, but only in the completeness case, not the soundness case. The concept is that if a language is in compIP, then interactively proving it is in some sense as easy as deciding it. With the oracle, the prover can easily solve the problem, but its limited power makes it much more difficult to convince the verifier of anything. In fact, compIP isn't even known or believed to contain NP.

On the other hand, such a system can solve some problems believed to be hard. Somewhat paradoxically, though such a system is not believed to be able to solve all of NP, it can easily solve all NP-complete problems due to self-reducibility. This stems from the fact that if the language L is not NP-hard, the prover is substantially limited in power (as it can no longer decide all NP problems with its oracle).

Additionally, the graph nonisomorphism problem (which is a classical problem in IP) is also in compIP, since the only hard operation the prover has to do is isomorphism testing, which it can use the oracle to solve. Quadratic non-residuosity and graph isomorphism are also in compIP. Note, quadratic non-residuosity (QNR) is likely an easier problem than graph isomorphism as QNR is in UP intersect co-UP.
