= Arrow information paradox =

Problem in intellectual property management

The Arrow information paradox (information paradox for short, or AIP), and occasionally referred to as Arrow's disclosure paradox, named after Kenneth Arrow, American economist and joint winner of the Nobel Memorial Prize in Economics with John Hicks, is a problem faced by companies when managing intellectual property across their boundaries. It occurs when they seek external technologies for their business or external markets for their own technologies. It has implications for the value of technology and innovations as well as their development by more than one firm, and for the need for and limitations of patent protection.

Arrow's information paradox theory was set out in a 1962 article by K. J. Arrow. Cornell Law School professor Oskar Liivak has written in a paper for a conference at Stanford University that Arrow's article "has been one of the foundational theoretical pillars of the incentive based theory of patents as Arrow’s work is thought to rule out a strictly market-based solution".

A fundamental tenet of the paradox is that the customer, i.e. the potential purchaser of the information describing a technology (or other information having some value, such as facts), wants to know the technology and what it does in sufficient detail as to understand its capabilities or have information about the facts or products to decide whether or not to buy it. Once the customer has this detailed knowledge, however, the seller has in effect transferred the technology to the customer without any compensation. This has been argued to show the need for patent protection.

If the buyer trusts the seller or is protected via contract, then they only need to know the results that the technology will provide, along with any caveats for its usage in a given context. Problems with this solution include that sellers can lie; they may be mistaken; one or both sides overlook side consequences for usage in a given context; or some unknown unknown affects the actual outcome.

Discussions of the value of patent rights have taken Arrow's information paradox into account in their evaluations. The theory has been the basis for many later economic studies. These include theories that pre-patent innovation can be carried out only by a single firm.

== See also ==
- Arrow's impossibility theorem
- Non-disclosure agreement
- Zero-knowledge proof
