= Privacy protocol =

Privacy protocols are guidelines intended to allow computation while still protecting the individuals involved. It can be developed from just two individuals trying to discover if they both know the same secret, without leaking information about the secret itself. In this case, after the protocol runs, both individuals will either know that they share the secret, or know that they do not share it; they will have gained no additional information about the other's secret.

== Examples of privacy protocols ==
For example, say the secret is a name of a person. One protocol is to use a random phone number, such as 555-111-2222, then replace the last n digits of the phone number with the secret such as 555-111-JOHN. Then the first person calls the number and leaves a message with the person on the other end for the second person. Next the second person calls the number of their secret and asks if there are any messages for him. One issue with this protocol is that the phone number created might not exist.

Another protocol without this issue is to designate an airline, destination and date, and have the first person make a reservation using the name of their secret, then the second person goes and cancels the reservation using the name of their secret. If the second person is not successful, then they don't share the secret.

A simple protocol that does not rely on a human third party involves password changing. This works anywhere one has to type in new passwords the same twice before the password is changed. The first individual will type their secret in the first box, and the second person will type their secret in the second box, if the password is successfully changed then the secret is shared. However the computer is still a third party and must be trusted not to have a key logger.

A more involved protocol that does not involve any reliance on a third party, human or machine, involves n cups, each with a label of the name of a person that could be the secret. Each individual will then place a slip of paper under each cup, one slip of paper will say 'yes' on it and will go under the cup with the name of the secret on it, all the other slips will say 'no'. Then the labels will be removed, the cups shuffled, then flipped over to reveal the slips of paper. If there is a cup with both slips of paper saying 'yes' on them then they share the secret.

There are many other protocols that involve two individuals.
